= List of mass spectrometry software =

Mass spectrometry software is used for data acquisition, analysis, or representation in mass spectrometry.

== Proteomics software ==
In protein mass spectrometry, tandem mass spectrometry (also known as MS/MS or MS^{2}) experiments are used for protein/peptide identification. Peptide identification algorithms fall into two broad classes: database search and de novo search. The former search takes place against a database containing all amino acid sequences assumed to be present in the analyzed sample. In contrast, the latter infers peptide sequences without knowledge of genomic data.

=== Database search algorithms ===
Name	Type	Description
Andromeda	Freeware	Andromeda is a peptide search engine based on probabilistic scoring, developed by Jürgen Cox and others at the Max Planck Institute of Biochemistry. It can handle data with arbitrarily high fragment mass accuracy and is able to assign and score complex patterns of post-translational modifications, such as highly phosphorylated peptides. It can function independently or integrated into other software, enabling analysis of large datasets on a desktop computer.
Byonic	Proprietary	Byonic is a database search algorithm released in 2011 by Protein Metrics Inc. with original developments at PARC. It searches MS/MS data from all types of instruments and internally employs the program Combyne, which combines peptide identifications to produce protein scores and identification probabilities.
CHIMERYS	Proprietary	CHIMERYS is a cloud-native database search algorithm that makes heavy use of artificial intelligence for the identification of peptides and the deconvolution of chimeric spectra. CHIMERYS is developed by MSAID GmbH, which was started at the Technical University of Munich.
Comet	Open source	Comet is a command-line database search algorithm developed at the University of Washington. It takes in spectra in supported input formats and writes out .pep.xml, .pin.xml, .sqt and/or .out files.
Greylag	Open source	Greylag is a database search algorithm developed at the Stowers Institute for Medical Research designed to perform large searches on computational clusters containing hundreds of nodes.
InsPecT	Open source	InsPecT is an MS-alignment search algorithm developed by the Center for Computational Mass Spectrometry at the University of California, San Diego.
Mascot	Proprietary	Mascot performs mass spectrometry data analysis through a statistical evaluation of matches between observed and projected peptide fragments.
MassMatrix	Freeware	MassMatrix is a database search algorithm for tandem mass spectrometric data. It uses a mass accuracy-sensitive, probabilistic scoring model to rank peptide and protein matches.
MassWiz	Open source	MassWiz is a search algorithm developed at the Institute of Genomics and Integrative Biology that can be used as a Windows command-line tool.
MetaMorpheus	Open source	MetaMorpheus is a proteomics search software developed at the University of Wisconsin-Madison with integrated calibration, post-translational modification discovery, bottom-up and top-down proteomics search, cross-linking mass spectrometry (XL-MS) search, proteogenomic search, and label-free quantification (LFQ) capabilities.
MSFragger	Freeware	MSFragger is a database searching tool based on efficient fragment ion indexing developed at the University of Michigan. It is capable of open (mass-tolerant) searches for post-translational modification discovery, O- and N-linked glycoproteomics searches, semi- and non-enzymatic searches, and traditional database searches.
MS-GF+	Open source	MS-GF+ (also known as MSGF+ or MSGFPlus) performs peptide identification by scoring MS/MS spectra against peptides derived from a protein sequence database. MS-GF+ was developed at the Center for Computational Mass Spectrometry at the University of California, San Diego, with later work at Pacific Northwest National Laboratory (PNNL).
MS-LAMP	Open Source	MS-LAMP is a standalone software capable of aiding in interpreting electrospray ionization (ESI) and/or matrix-assisted laser desorption and ionization (MALDI) mass spectrometric data of lipids.
MyriMatch	Open source	MyriMatch is a database search program developed at the Vanderbilt University Medical Center designed to run in a single-computer environment or across an entire cluster of processing nodes.
NIST Mass Spectral Search v.3.0	Commercial Program	This software contains the NIST/EPA/NIH Mass Spectral Library of electron ionization (EI) and the NIST Tandem Library of product-ion mass spectra in a searchable database. Additional features include the NIST MS Interpreter Program and AMDIS. It was developed by the National Institute of Standards and Technology.
OMSSA	Freeware	The Open Mass Spectrometry Search Algorithm (OMSSA) is a search engine for identifying MS/MS peptide spectra by searching libraries of known protein sequences. OMSSA identifies significant hits with a probability score developed using classical hypothesis testing, the same statistical method used in BLAST. It is developed at the National Center for Biotechnology Information.
PEAKS DB	Proprietary	Peaks DB is a database search engine, run in parallel with de novo sequencing to automatically validate search results, allowing for more found sequences for a given false discovery rate. In addition to providing an independent database search, results can be incorporated as part of the software's multi-engine (Sequest, Mascot, X!Tandem, OMSSA, PEAKS DB) consensus reporting tool inChorus. The tool also provides a list of sequences identified exclusively by de novo sequencing.
pFind	Freeware	pFind Studio is a computational solution for mass spectrometry-based proteomics. It was developed in 2002 in the Institute of Computing Technology, Chinese Academy of Sciences, Beijing, China.
Phenyx	Proprietary	Phenyx is a sequence database search engine developed by Geneva Bioinformatics (GeneBio) in collaboration with the Swiss Institute of Bioinformatics (SIB). Phenyx incorporates OLAV, a family of statistical scoring models, to generate and optimize scoring schemes that can be tailored for all kinds of instruments, instrumental set-ups and general sample treatments.
ProbID	Open source	ProbID is a software tool designed to identify peptides from tandem mass spectra using a protein sequence database. It was developed at the Bioinformatics Group, Institute of Computing Technology, Chinese Academy of Sciences, Beijing, China.
ProLuCID	Freeware	ProLuCID is an algorithm for peptide identification using tandem mass spectrometry and protein sequence databases recently developed by Tao Xu and others in the Yates laboratory at The Scripps Research Institute.
ProSightPC and ProSightPD	Proprietary	ProSightPC/PD are software tools for searching peptide and protein tandem mass spectrometry data against UniProt-derived databases to identify and characterize proteoforms.
ProteinPilot Software	Proprietary	ProteinPilot uses Paragon database search algorithm that combines the generation of short sequence tags ('taglets') for computation of sequence temperature values and estimates of feature probabilities to enable peptide identification. It considers hundreds of modifications, non-tryptic cleavages, and amino acid substitutions. It uses the Pro Group Algorithm for protein inference analysis to report a minimal set of proteins justified based on the peptide evidence. ProteinPilot supports quantification for label-based workflows (iTRAQ reagents, mTRAQ reagents and SILAC labeling). A translation layer converts user interface controls in the language of a proteomics scientist to underlying complex informatics parameters.
Protein Prospector	Open source	Protein Prospector is a package of about twenty proteomic analysis tools developed at the University of California San Francisco. The tandem mass spectrometry searching software is Batch-Tag and Batch-Tag Web, with the results processed and displayed using Search Compare.
RAId	Lost	RAId was developed at the National Center for Biotechnology Information, Robust Accurate Identification (RAId) is a suite of proteomics tools for statistical analysis of tandem mass spectrometry data.
SEQUEST	Proprietary	SEQUEST is a MS data analysis program used for protein identification. It correlates collections of tandem mass spectra to peptide sequences that have been generated from databases of protein sequences.
SIMS	Open source	SIMS was designed to perform unrestricted PTM searches over tandem mass spectra.
SimTandem	Freeware	SimTandem is a database search engine for identification of peptide sequences from LC/MS/MS data. The engine can be used as an external tool in OpenMS/TOPP.
SQID	Open source	SeQuence IDentification (SQID) is an intensity-incorporated protein identification algorithm for tandem mass spectrometry.
Tide (rewrite of Crux)	Open source	Tide is a tool to identify peptides from tandem mass spectra. It is an independent re-implementation of the SEQUEST algorithm, which identifies peptides by comparing the observed spectra to a catalog of theoretical spectra derived in silico from a database of known proteins. The immediate ancestor of Tide is Crux, but Tide was re-engineered to achieve speed improvement while replicating SEQUEST XCorr scores. It was developed at the University of Washington.
TopMG	Open source	TopMG (Top-down mass spectrometry-based proteoform identification using Mass Graphs) is a software tool for identifying ultra-modified proteoforms by searching top-down tandem mass spectra against a protein sequence database. It is capable of identifying proteoforms with multiple variable PTMs and unexpected alterations, such as histone and phosphorylated proteoforms, using mass graphs. Approximate spectrum-based filtering methods are employed for protein sequence filtering, and a Markov chain Monte Carlo method (TopMCMC) is used for estimating the statistical significance of identifications.
TopPIC	Open source	TopPIC (Top-down mass spectrometr/y-based Proteoform Identification and Characterization) identifies and characterizes proteoforms at the proteome level by searching top-down tandem mass spectra against a protein sequence database. TopPIC is a successor to MS-Align+. It identifies proteoforms with unexpected alterations, such as mutations and post-translational modifications (PTMs), estimates the statistical significance of identifications, and characterizes reported proteoforms with unknown mass shifts. Techniques used such as indexes, spectral alignment, generation function methods and the modification identification score (MIScore) seek to increase speed, sensitivity, and accuracy.
X!Tandem	Open source	X!Tandem matches tandem mass spectra with peptide sequences.
WsearchVS2020	Freeware	WsearchVS2020 is a data analysis software that can display spectra acquired on commercial MS instruments and can also search/match the NIST commercial database.

=== De novo sequencing algorithms ===
De novo peptide sequencing algorithms are, in general, based on the approach proposed in Bartels et al. (1990).

Name	Type	Description
Casanovo	Open source	Casanovo is a machine learning model that uses a transformer neural network architecture to translate the sequence of peaks in a tandem mass spectrum into the sequence of amino acids that comprise the generating peptide, enabling de novo peptide sequencing without prior information.
CycloBranch	Open source	CycloBranch is a stand-alone, cross-platform and open-source de novo engine for identification of nonribosomal peptides (linear, cyclic, branched and branch-cyclic) from accurate product ion spectra.
DeNoS		Sequencing of peptides uses all information from CAD and ECD spectra; it is part of the software tool Proteinmatching Analysis Software (PAS) which in turn is part of the software package Medicwave Bioinformatics Suite (MBS).
DeNovoX	Proprietary	De novo sequencing on CID spectra acquired with ion trap mass spectrometers delivers complete and/or partial peptide sequences (sequence tags).
InstaNovo	Open source	InstaNovo is a transformer neural network that can translate fragment ion peaks into the sequence of amino acids that make up the studied peptide(s), enabling de novo peptide sequencing without prior information. Trained on 28 million labeled spectra, it outperforms current state-of-the-art methods on benchmark datasets. InstaNovo+, a multinomial diffusion model built upon human intuition, further improves performance through iterative refinement of predicted sequences.
Lutefisk	Open source	This is software for the de novo interpretation of peptide CID spectra.
Novor	Proprietary, free for academic research	This real-time de novo peptide sequencing engine is claimed to be fast, accurate and easily integrated into research pipelines.
PEAKS	Proprietary	PEAKS provides de novo sequencing for each peptide, confidence scores on individual amino acid assignments with manually assisted mode and automated de novo sequencing on an entire LC run, with data processed faster than 1 spectrum per second.
Supernovo	Proprietary	This software automates de novo sequencing of monoclonal antibodies.

=== Homology searching algorithms ===
Name	Type	Description
MS-Homology	Open source	MS-Homology is a database search program within the Protein Prospector package that permits searching with strings that combine masses and amino acid stretches and where one can specify the number of amino acid mismatches allowed.
SPIDER	Proprietary	The SPIDER algorithm matches sequence tags with errors to database sequences for the purpose of protein and peptide identification and can be used in conjunction with PEAKS mass spectrometry data analysis software.

== MS/MS peptide quantification ==
Name	Type	Description
BACIQ	Open source	BACIQ is a mathematically rigorous approach that integrates peptide intensities and peptide-measurement agreement into confidence intervals for protein ratios.
Byos	Proprietary	Byos commercial software allows XIC of peptide level mass spec data from any MS vendor and relative quantity of PTM vs unmodified. It is specialized for biopharmaceutical applications.
DIA-NN	Freeware	This automated quantitative Data-independent acquisition-proteomics software, developed by the Demichev and Ralser labs at the Charité in Berlin, Germany, implements a machine-learning algorithm based on an ensemble of deep neural networks, to boost proteomic depth and reliability of peptide and protein identification. DIA-NN is optimized for processing of large-scale experiments. It supports DIA-based profiling of PTMs, such as phosphorylation and ubiquitination, new technologies such as Scanning SWATH and dia-PASEF, and can perform library-free analyses (acts as a database search engine).
FlashLFQ	Open source	FlashLFQ is an ultrafast label-free quantification algorithm for mass-spectrometry proteomics. FlashLFQ is also bundled into MetaMorpheus search software, which is described above.
MarkerView Software	Proprietary	This commercial software is for statistical analysis of quantitative mass spec data sets from metabolomics and proteomic profiling applications.
Mascot Distiller	Proprietary	This software for peak picking and raw data preprocessing has an optional toolbox for label-free quantification, as well as isobaric labeling and isotopic labeling. It supports raw file formats from all major instrument vendors.
Mascot Server	Proprietary	The search engine supports quantification based on isobaric labeling as long as all the required information is part of the MS/MS spectrum.
MassChroQ	Open source	Peptide quantification analysis of label-free or various isotopic labeling methods (SILAC, ICAT, N-15, C-13 ...) works with high and low resolution spectrometer systems and supports complex data treatments, such as peptide or protein fractionation, prior to LC-MS analysis (SCX, SDS-PAGE, etc.).
MaxQuant	Freeware	Quantitative proteomics software developed by Jürgen Cox and others at the Max Planck Institute of Biochemistry in Martinsried, Germany was written in C#, which allows the analysis of label free and SILAC-based proteomics experiments. MaxQuant uses the andromeda search engine for the interpretation of the MS/MS spectra.
MultiQuant Software	Proprietary	This software can process quantitative data sets from TripleTOF or QTRAP systems, including MRM and SWATH Acquisition.
OpenPIP	Website, open access	OpenPIP is a tool developed by InterVenn Biosciences to integrate peaks acquired in multiple reaction monitoring (MRM) experiments. The software is powered by recurrent neural networks and guided by a large collection of manually-annotated chromatographic peaks.
ProtMax	Freeware	ProtMAX is a software tool for analyzing shotgun proteomics mass spectrometry data sets, developed by Volker Egelhofer at the University of Vienna.
Skyline	Open source	Skyline is open source (Apache 2.0) Windows client software developed in the MacCoss lab at University of Washington. It supports building Selected Reaction Monitoring (SRM) / Multiple Reaction Monitoring (MRM), Parallel Reaction Monitoring (PRM - Targeted MS/MS), Data Independent Acquisition (DIA/SWATH) and targeted DDA with MS1 quantitative methods and analysis of the resulting mass spectrometer data.
Spectronaut	Proprietary	Biognosys AG (Schlieren, Switzerland) developed this commercial software for quantitative proteomics based on the mProphet algorithm that allows the targeted analysis of data independent acquisition (DIA) data sets for label-free peptide quantitation, also called SWATH acquisition.
SWATH Software 2.0	Proprietary	This commercial software processing tool within PeakView allows targeted data processing of SWATH acquisition data. Using a protein/peptide ion library, fragment ion extracted ion chromatograms (XICs) are generated, scored and quantified for peptides from the library. After false discovery rate analysis (FDR), results are filtered and quantitative peptide/protein data can be exported for statistical analysis.

== Other software ==
Name	Type	Description
Advanced Chemistry Development	Proprietary	ACD offers commercial solutions for the interpretation of MS and xC/MS data with spectrum/structure matching, identification of known and unknown metabolites, as well as identification of compounds through spectral comparison.
AMDIS	Freeware	NIST created this software for GC/MS data in various formats. It deconvolutes coeluting mass spectra, displays mass chromatograms, calculates retention indexes, allows for target compound libraries, and will export spectra to the NISMS Mass Spectral Search Program.
Analyst	Proprietary	Analyst was created by AB Sciex, a division of The Danaher Corporation, for control of LC-MS/MS systems.
AnalyzerPro	Proprietary	AnalyzerPro is a vendor-independent software application from SpectralWorks for processing mass spectrometry data. It can process both GC-MS and LC-MS data using qualitative and quantitative data processing and is used in metabolomics with MatrixAnalyzer for the comparison of multiple data sets. It was recently extended to include statistical analysis and visualization tools (PCA). AnalyzerPro XD is a 64-bit version that includes support for 2 dimensional data processing such as GCxGC-MS.
ArtIST by Clover Biosoft	Proprietary	Artificial Intelligence Strain Typing is an online service offering MALDI-TOF MS data analysis and biomarker discovery tools, based on artificial intelligence and machine learning algorithms.
ASCENT	Proprietary	ASCENT is an LC and GC-MS data analysis automation tool, provided as SaaS over a cloud platform. It uses machine learning algorithms to analyze MS plots and reduce the amount of manual review required.
CFM-ID	Open source	This software is for in-silico ESI-MS/MS spectra prediction, MS/MS spectra annotation, and compound identification based on an MS/MS spectrum. It was developed in Wishartlab
Chromeleon	Proprietary	Chromeleon is Thermo Fisher Scientific software used with mass spectrometry instruments, as well as chromatography instruments.
Clover MSDAS	Proprietary	Cloud-based platform for data analysis with FTIR and MALDI TOF MS data. Subtyping and AMR detection in FTIR and MALDI spectra. Biomarker analysis, Quality control, reproducibility studies and training of machine learning models.
Crosslinx	Open source	Identify cross-linked peptides from mzML files and use Python script or standalone executables for Linux and Windows. It is feasible to use with bigger databases with a two-step approach.
DataAnalysis	Proprietary	Software by Bruker used with mass spectrometry instruments.
DeNovoGUI	Open source	The software has a graphical user interface for running parallelized versions of the freely available de novo sequencing software tools Novor and PepNovo+.
Easotope	Open source	Easotope software archives, organizes, and analyzes mass spectrometer data. It is currently oriented toward clumped CO_{2} analysis but is also useful for bulk CO_{2} work and expandable to other isotopic systems.
El-MAVEN	Open-source	Desktop software by Elucidata processes labeled LC-MS, GC-MS and LC-MS/MS data in open-formats (mzXML, mzML, CDF). The software has a graphical and command line interface with integration to a cloud platform for storage and further analyses like relative flux and quantification.
ESIprot		ESIprot can determine charge state and calculate molecular weight for low resolution electrospray ionization (ESI) mass spectrometry (MS) data of proteins.
Expressionist	Proprietary	Expressionist is software for processing, analyzing, and reporting mass spectrometry data in application areas such as biotherapeutics characterization, quality monitoring, and related proteomics and metabolomics applications. It was developed by Genedata.
HIquant	Open source	This first-principles model and algorithm quantifies proteoform stoichiometries from bottom-up data.
KnowItAll Spectroscopy Software & Mass Spectral Library	Proprietary	Software from Wiley with applications for mass spectrometry including: spectral analysis, database searching (spectrum, structure, peak, property, MS Adaptive Search, etc.), processing, database building (MS or multiple techniques including IR, Raman, NMR, UV, Chromatograms), spectral subtraction, plus tools for reporting and ChemWindow structure drawing, and MASSTransit file conversion software (updated with more formats).
LabSolutions LCMS	Proprietary	Software by Shimadzu Corporation is used with mass spectrometry and HPLC instruments.
LipidXplorer	Open source	A high-throughput lipid identification software from shotgun mass spectra written in Python.
Mass++	Open source	Analysis software for mass spectrometry can import and export files with open-formats (mzXML, mzML) and load some instrument vendor formats; users can develop and add original functions as Mass++ plug-ins.
MassBank	Open source	MassBank and RMassBank development website is provided by the MassBank consortium. MassBank data are shared under a Creative Commons license.
MassBank.eu	Website	European MassBank server. The website is maintained and hosted by the Helmholtz Centre for Environmental Research (Leipzig, Germany). MassBank.eu is a core of the NFDI4Chem consortium.
MassBank.jp	Website	Website hosted by the Institute for Advanced Biosciences, in Keio University, Tsuruoka City, Yamagata, Japan with mass spectrometric data for organic compounds.
MassCenter	Proprietary	Software by JEOL used with mass spectrometry instruments.
Mass Frontier	Proprietary	Software by HighChem used for interpretation and management of mass spectra of small molecules.
MassLynx	Proprietary	Software by Waters Corporation for analytical instrument control.
MassMap	Proprietary	General-purpose software suite for automated evaluation of MS data by MassMap GmbH & Co. KG. It is suitable for LC/MS and GC/MS data of all kinds of molecules, the analysis of intact mass spectra of proteins, the analysis of general HDX experiments and the HDX fragment analysis of peptides, with particular methods for the identification of unexpected/unknown components in very complex mixtures.
Mass Mountaineer	Proprietary	Qualitative analysis and reporting software includes chemometric functions for working with one or more text-format mass spectra.
Mass-Up	Open-source	Utility for proteomics designed to support the preprocessing and analysis of MALDI-TOF mass spectrometry data that loads data from mzML, mzXML and CSV files. It allows users to apply baseline correction, normalization, smoothing, peak detection and peak matching. In addition, it allows the application of different machine learning and statistical methods to the pre-processed data for biomarker discovery, unsupervised clustering and supervised sample classification.
massXpert	Open source GPL	Graphical user interface-based (GUI) software for simulating and analyzing mass spectrometric data obtained on known bio-polymer sequences. It is a successor to polyxmass and a program of the msXpertSuite software suite.
Mestrenova	Proprietary	A vendor-independent software for processing chromatography (LC, GC, SFC) data with any combination of detectors, e.g. LC-MS-UV-VIS, GC-MS, SFC-MS-UV in one environment. This multiplatform and web-based software was created by Mestrelab Research, S.L.
matchms	Open source	Python library imports, cleans, processes and quantitatively compares MS/MS spectra and was developed at the Netherlands eScience Center.
METASPACE	Free and open-source	Cloud platform for metabolite and lipid identification and a community-populated knowledge base of spatial metabolomes, with thousands of public datasets shared by the users: metaspace2020.eu. It also provides capacities for online data visualization, sharing, and publishing.
METIS	Proprietary, SaaS	AI-based software for automated processing of GC–MS data. It uses multiple proprietary GC–MS libraries containing 10 million spectra and a de novo AI model to annotate all peaks in a chromatogram. The AI model analyses spectra independently of existing databases and can generate molecular structures for unknown compounds with an accuracy of 37%. The software was developed at the University of Münster and is distributed by ChemInnovation.Website
METLIN Database and Technology Platform	Proprietary	Tandem mass spectrometry (MS/MS) database of over 930,000 (as of December 2023) metabolites and other molecular entities, generated from high resolution quadrupole time-of-flight tandem mass spectrometry. It also includes, ion mobility, neutral loss, and LC/MS data.
mineXpert	Open source GPL	This graphical user interface-based (GUI) software for mass spectral data visualization/mining supports ion mobility mass spectrometry and is a program of the msXpertSuite software suite.
mMass	Open source	Multi-platform package of tools for mass spectrometric data analysis and interpretation written in Python (no longer developed).
MolAna		MolAna was developed by Phenomenome Discoveries Inc, (PDI) for use in IONICS Mass Spectrometry Group's 3Q Molecular Analyzer, Triple quadrupole mass spectrometer.
msAxel	Proprietary	Software used by JEOL time-of-flight mass spectrometers
msFineAnalysis	Proprietary	Qualitative analysis software for JEOL GC-MS systems. The msFineAnalysis AI version for JEOL's GC-time-of-flight mass spectrometers contains a searchable in-silico database of mass spectra calculated for the 100 million structures in the PubChem database.
MSGraph	Open source	This tool does qualitative analysis of mass spectrometric (MS) data and is hosted by SourceForge.
MSight	Freeware	Software for mass spectrometry imaging developed by the Swiss Institute of Bioinformatics.
MSiReader	Freeware	Vendor-neutral interface built on the Matlab platform designed to view and perform data analysis of mass spectrometry imaging (MSI) data. Matlab is not required to use MSiReader.
MS Interpreter	Freeware	Software by NIST for compression of structure with mass spectra. The program seeks to find mechanisms and their rates for all fragmentation types (EI, Tandem positive and negative mode) and correlates mass spectral peaks to a probable origin structure. It contains an isotope calculator and other features and on-line help. This program is a companion to the NIST Spectra Search Program, v.3.0. It is usable as a standalone with the import of a structure and spectrum.
mspire	Open-source	Mspire is an MS informatics developer's toolbox, written in ruby, that includes an mzML reader/writer, in-silico digestion and isotopic pattern calculation, etc. Submodules such as mspire-lipidomics, mspire-sequest, and mspire-simulator extend the functionality.
MSqRob	Open-source	This is an "R" package with graphical user interface for differential abundance analysis of label-free quantitative proteomics data.
ms2mz	Freeware	Utility converts between mass spectrometer file formats, e.g. to convert proprietary binary files to MGF peak list files, to prepare for upload to Proteome Cluster.
Multimaging	Proprietary	Software for mass spectrometry imaging designed to normalize, validate and interpret MS images.
multiMS-toolbox	Open source	MS-alone and multiMS-toolbox is a tool chain for mass spectrometry data peak extraction and statistical analysis.
mzCloud	Website	Web-based mass spectral database that comprises a collection of high and low resolution tandem mass spectrometry data acquired under a number of experimental conditions.
MZmine	Open source	An open-source software for mass spectrometry data processing, with the main focus on LC-MS data.
OmicsHub Proteomics		Laboratory information management software for mass spectrometry information management and data analysis.
OpenChrom	Open source	Chromatography and mass spectrometry software that can be extended using plug-ins and can run on several operating systems (Microsoft Windows, Linux, Unix, Mac OS X) and processor architectures (x86, x86_64, ppc). It has converters for the native access of various data files, e.g. converters for mzXML, netCDF, Agilent, Finnigan and Varian file formats.
OpenMS / TOPP / pyOpenMS	Open source	The software C++ and Python library for LC-MS/MS data management and analysis offers an infrastructure for the development of mass spectrometry-related software. It allows peptide and metabolite quantification and supports label-free and isotopic-label-based quantification (such as iTRAQ and TMT and SILAC) as well as targeted SWATH-MS quantification.
ORIGAMI	Open source	The ORIGAMI software suite is for analysis of mass spectrometry and ion mobility mass spectrometry datasets. It was originally developed to improve the analysis workflows of activated IM-MS/collision-induced unfolding (CIU) datasets and allow seamless visualization of results. Recently, ORIGAMI was modified to be more accepting of non-MS centric and enables visualization of results from other sources as well as the exporting of results in an interactive format, where the user can share any dataset and visualize results in a web browser.
PatternLab	Freeware	Software for post-analysis of SEQUEST, ProLuCID or Comet database search results filtered by DTASelect or Census.
Peaksel	Proprietary	This web-based (available both in cloud as SaaS and as on-prem installation) software for LC/MS data processing supports batch processing and high-throughput experiments. It is "vendor agnostic."
PeakStrainer	Open source	Intensity-Independent Noise Filtering in FT MS and FT MS/MS spectra for Shotgun Lipidomics (Python)
Peacock	Open source	Mac OS X application developed by Johan Kool that can be used to interpret gas-chromatography/mass-spectrometry (GC/MS) data files.
PeakInvestigator	Proprietary	A program designed to detect and deconvolve overlapping MS data, which can increase the effective resolution of spectra by 3-4 times.
PetroOrg	Proprietary	Software was developed specifically for analyzing petroleum, but it is also used to analyze "other complex mixtures, including anthropogenic environmental contaminants and natural organic matter."
Pinnacle	Proprietary	A proteomics analysis software with modules for translational proteomics, glycoproteomics, and biopharma analysis. It includes comprehensive quantitation of thousands of proteins across hundreds of samples using DDA, DIA, PRM or SRM with fully integrated statistics and biological interpretation. There is a complete N-linked glycoprotein identification routine and an in-depth analysis in protein characterization, including peptide mapping, error tolerant search and disulfide analysis.
PIQMIe	Web	Proteomics Identifications/quantitations data management and integration service is a web-based tool that aids scalable data management, analysis and visualization of semi-quantitative (SILAC) proteomics experiments.
POTAMOS	Open source	This web application calculates mass spectrometry data independently of instrumentation and is focused on a well known protein family of histones whose PTMs are believed to play a crucial role in gene regulation. It calculates the kind, number and combinations of the possible PTMs corresponding to a given peptide sequence and mass.
ProMass	Proprietary	ProMass is an automated biomolecule deconvolution and reporting software package used to process ESI/LC/MS data or single ESI mass spectra. It uses the deconvolution algorithm, ZNova, to produce artifact-free deconvoluted mass spectra. There is also a "lite" browser-based format called ProMass for the Web that does not require any installation or software download.
ProteoIQ	Proprietary	Software for the post-analysis of Mascot, SEQUEST, or X!Tandem database search results.
PROTRAWLER		LC/MS data reduction application that reads raw mass spectrometry vendor data (from several well-known instrument companies) and creates triplet lists {mass, retention time, integrated signal intensity} summarizing the LC/MS chromatogram.
Proteomatic	Freeware	Data processing pipeline created for the purpose of evaluating mass spectrometric proteomics experiments.
ProteomicsTools	Open source	Software for the post-analysis of MASCOT, SEQUEST, Comet, XTandem, PFind, PeptidePhophet, MyriMatch, MSGF, OMSSA, MSAmanda or Percolator database search results.
ProteoWizard	Open source	Link library and tools that are a set of modular and extensible open-source, cross-platform tools and software libraries that facilitate proteomics data analysis.
ProteoWorker	Proprietary	Cloud-based software for proteomics data analysis including COMET, Peptide Prophet, ProteinProphet and extensive data sorting, filtering and annotation tools.
Provision	Open source	Cloud-based software written in R for analysing proteomics data generated by MaxQuant. This software analyzes differential quantification data and is assisted by tools and visualization options. It is possible to process label-free and tandem mass-tagged data.
pymzML	Open source	Python module to interface mzML data in Python, based on cElementTree with additional tools for MS-informatics.
Pyteomics	Open source	A Python framework for proteomics data analysis.
Quantem		Software for ESI-MS quantification without analytical standards. Developed in Kruvelab, distributed by Quantem Analytics.
Quantinetix	Proprietary	Software for mass spectrometry imaging designed to quantify and normalize MS images in various study types. It is compatible with a variety of MSI instruments, including Bruker, Sciex, Thermo and with the iMZML data format.
Rational Numbers Excel Add-In	Proprietary	De novo identification tool for small molecules that works with Microsoft Excel (2010, 2013, 2016 and 2019). This software treats small molecules as mathematical partitions of the molecular mass and generates subfragment formulas with atoms that are sets of partitions comprising the molecular formula.
Rational Numbers SPS	Proprietary	This seeks to identify small molecules by comparing accurate-mass fragmentation data to a database of 250,000 molecules represented as mathematical partitions of the exact molecular masses. SPS (Similar Partition Searching) is designed to rapidly analyze and summarize multiple chromatographic MS/MS datasets acquired by DDA (data dependent acquisition).
REGATTA		An LC/MS list comparison application that works with ProTrawler (but accepts input in Excel/CSV form) to provide an environment for LC/MS results list filtering and normalization {mass, retention time, integrated intensity}.
RemoteAnalyzer	Proprietary	Software by SpectralWorks for vendor-independent 'Open Access' client/server-based solutions to provide a "walk-up and use" LC-MS and GC-MS data system. Instrument control and data processing support for multiple vendors' hardware. NMR instrumentation and data processing are also supported.
Scaffold	Proprietary	Suite of proteomics tools for analyzing spectra, peptides and proteins across multiple samples.
SCIEX OS	Proprietary	Next generation software by SCIEX controlling the X-series mass spectrometers, with support for data analysis acquired using the Analyst software suite.
SCiLS Lab	Proprietary	Multi-vendor software for statistical analysis of mass spectrometry imaging data.
SFINX	Open source and web	The straightforward filtering index (SFINX) allows separation of true positive from false positive protein interactions in affinity purification - mass spectrometry and related datasets. It is accessible via its web-interface and as an R package.
SIM-XL	Freeware	Spectrum Identification Machine for Cross-linked Peptides (SIM-XL) is an XL search engine that is part of the PatternLab for proteomics environment, to analyze tandem mass spectrometry data derived from cross-linked peptides.
SimGlycan	Proprietary	Predicts the structure of glycans and glycopeptides using mass spectrometry MS/MS data.
SIMION	Proprietary	SIMION is an ion optics simulation program.
SIRIUS	Open source and web service	An umbrella application for the annotation of small molecules from LC-MS/MS data.
Spectrolyzer	Proprietary	Spectrolyzer is a Microsoft Windows-based software package developed by Binary Detect (previously named Medicwave) that provides bioinformatics data analysis tools for different mass spectrometers. It focuses on finding protein biomarkers and detecting protein deviations.
Spectromania	Proprietary	Software for analysis and visualization of mass spectrometric data.
StavroX	Freeware	Software to identify cross-linked peptides from mass spectrometric data written in Java that can be used for a wide variety of cross linkers and proteases used in the cross linking MS experiment; it compares theoretical peptide-peptide cross link combinations for the analyzed proteins to MS/MS data.
Swiss Mass Abacus	Open source	Swiss Mass Abacus is a calculator of peptide and glycopeptide masses. It is purposefully kept as simple as a basic calculator executing arithmetic operations.
TOF-DS	Proprietary	Software by Markes International used with BenchTOF time-of-flight mass spectrometers.
TopFD	Open source	TopFD (Top-down mass spectral Feature Detection) is a software tool for top-down spectral deconvolution and a successor to MS-Deconv. It groups top-down spectral peaks into isotopomer envelopes and converts them to monoisotopic neutral masses. In addition, it extracts proteoform features from LC-MS or CE-MS data.
Trans-Proteomic Pipeline (TPP)	Open source	The Trans-Proteomic Pipeline (TPP) is a collection of integrated tools for MS/MS proteomics. It includes: PeptideProphet for the Statistical validation of PSMs using search engine results; iProphet for distinct peptide sequence validation, using PeptideProphet results (can combine results of multiple search engines); and ProteinProphet for Protein identification and validation, using PeptideProphet or iProphet results. TPP also does: Protein Quantification with XPRESS (calculates relative peptide/protein abundances from isotopically labeled MS/MS samples); ASAPRatio (Automated Statistical Analysis on Protein Ratio, an alternative to XPRESS); and Libra (quantification of isobarically labeled samples (e.g. iTraq, TMT, etc.) for any number of channels). The TPP currently supports Sequest, Mascot, ProbID, X!Tandem, Comet, SpectraST, MSGF+, Inspect, MyriMatch, and Phenyx. It was developed at the Seattle Proteomic Centre (SPC).
TurboMass	Proprietary	TurboMass is GC/MS software created by PerkinElmer.
Universal Mass Calculator	Freeware	UMC is programmed as a mass spectrometry tool to assist interpreting measurement results, mainly derived from molecular or quasi-molecular ions. It can be used for the calculation of: Mass deviation (mmu or ppm) of measured mass from given empirical formula; Mass differences of two empirical formulas; Elemental compositions (also considering measured intensity pattern, "most abundant" algorithm included); Isotope pattern simulation from empirical formulas; Analysis of the degree of isotope labelling with D, ^{13}C, ^{15}N or ^{18}O.
VIPER		VIPER analyzes accurate mass and chromatography retention times of LC-MS features (accurate mass and time tag approach).
Xcalibur	Proprietary	Software by Thermo Fisher Scientific used with mass spectrometry instruments.
XCMS Online (Cloud-Based)	Proprietary	Freely available and a widely used metabolomic and lipidomic data-processing platform.

== See also ==
- Mass spectrometry data format: for a list of mass spectrometry data viewers and format converters.
- List of protein structure prediction software
