= Skyline (software) =

Software for analysis of mass spectrometric data

- Developer(s): Brendan X. MacLean et al.
- Initial release: 17 February 2009; 16 years ago
- Stable release: 21.2
- Repository: github.com/ProteoWizard/pwiz/tree/master/pwiz_tools/Skyline
- Written in: C#
- Operating system: Windows
- Type: Bioinformatics / Mass spectrometry software
- License: Apache license 2.0
- Website: Skyline Homepage

Skyline is an open source software for targeted proteomics and metabolomics data analysis. It runs on Microsoft Windows and supports the raw data formats from multiple mass spectrometric vendors. It contains a graphical user interface to display chromatographic data for individual peptide or small molecule analytes.

Skyline supports multiple workflows including selected reaction monitoring (SRM) / multiple reaction monitoring (MRM), parallel reaction monitoring (PRM), data-independent acquisition (DIA/SWATH) and targeted data-dependent acquisition.

== See also ==
- ProteoWizard
- OpenMS
- Trans-Proteomic Pipeline
- Mass spectrometry software
