= Mass spectrometry data format =

Containers for scientific data

Mass spectrometry is a scientific technique for measuring the mass-to-charge ratio of ions. It is often coupled to chromatographic techniques such as gas- or liquid chromatography and has found widespread adoption in the fields of analytical chemistry and biochemistry where it can be used to identify and characterize small molecules and proteins (proteomics). The large volume of data produced in a typical mass spectrometry experiment requires that computers be used for data storage and processing. Over the years, different manufacturers of mass spectrometers have developed various proprietary data formats for handling such data which makes it difficult for academic scientists to directly manipulate their data. To address this limitation, several open, XML-based data formats have recently been developed by the Trans-Proteomic Pipeline at the Institute for Systems Biology to facilitate data manipulation and innovation in the public sector. These data formats are described here.

== Open formats ==
=== JCAMP-DX ===
This format was one of the earliest attempts to supply a standardized file format for data exchange in mass spectrometry. JCAMP-DX was initially developed for infrared spectrometry. JCAMP-DX is an ASCII based format and therefore not very compact even though it includes standards for file compression. JCAMP was officially released in 1988. Together with the American Society for Mass Spectrometry a JCAMP-DX format for mass spectrometry was developed with aim to preserve legacy data.

=== ANDI-MS or netCDF ===
The Analytical Data Interchange Format for Mass Spectrometry is a format for exchanging data. Many mass spectrometry software packages can read or write ANDI files. ANDI is specified in the ASTM E1947 Standard. ANDI is based on netCDF which is a software tool library for writing and reading data files. ANDI was initially developed for chromatography-MS data and therefore was not used in the proteomics gold rush where new formats based on XML were developed.

=== AnIML ===
AnIML is a joined effort of IUPAC and ASTM International to create an XML based standard that covers a wide variety of analytical techniques including mass spectrometry.

=== mzData ===
mzData was the first attempt by the Proteomics Standards Initiative (PSI) from the Human Proteome Organization (HUPO) to create a standardized format for Mass Spectrometry data. This format is now deprecated, and replaced by mzML.

=== mzXML ===
mzXML is an XML-based common file format for proteomics mass spectrometric data, developed at the Seattle Proteome Center/Institute for Systems Biology while the HUPO-PSI was trying to specify the standardized mzData format. As of 2026, it is still used by members of the proteomics community.

=== YAFMS ===
Yet Another Format for Mass Spectrometry (YAFMS) is a proposed format that saves data in four-table, relational, serverless database schemata, with data extraction and appending being exercised via SQL queries.

=== mzML ===
Owing to the undesirability of having two formats (namely mzData and mzXML) representing the same information, a joint effort was set up by HUPO-PSI, the SPC/ISB, and instruments vendors to create a unified standard, borrowing the best aspects of both mzData and mzXML and intending to replace both. Originally called dataXML, it was officially announced as mzML. The first specification was published in June 2008. This format was officially released at the 2008 American Society for Mass Spectrometry Meeting, and has since then been relatively stable, having received very few updates. On 1 June 2009, mzML 1.1.0 was released. There were no further changes planned as of 2013.

=== mzAPI ===
Instead of defining new file formats or writing converters for proprietary vendor formats, a group of scientists proposed a common application program interface to shift the burden of standards compliance to the instruments manufacturers' existing data-access libraries.

=== mz5 ===
The mz5 format addresses the performance problems present in other XML based formats (such as the above ones). It uses mzML's ontology, but saves the data using the HDF5 backend for reduced storage space requirements and improved read/write speed.

=== imzML ===
The imzML standard was proposed for mass spectrometry imaging data exchange in a standardized XML file based on the mzML ontology. It splits experimental data into XML and spectral data in a binary file. Both files are linked by a universally unique identifier.

=== mzDB ===
mzDB saves data in an SQLite database to save on storage space and improve access times, since the data points can be queried from a relational database.

=== Toffee ===
Toffee is a free lossless file format for data-independent acquisition mass spectrometry that leverages HDF5 and aims to achieve file sizes similar to those seen in proprietary/vendor-bound formats.

=== mzMLb ===
mzMLb is another take on using an HDF5 backend for performant raw-data saving. It, however, preserves the mzML XML data structure and stays compliant to the existing standard.

=== Allotrope ===
The Allotrope Foundation curates an HDF5- and Triplestore-based file format called Allotrope Data Format (ADF), as well as a flat JSON representation called Allotrope Simple Model (ASM), both of which are based on the Allotrope Foundation Ontologies (AFO) and contain schemas for mass spectrometry and chromatography coupled with mass-spectrometric detectors.

=== mzPeak ===
Due to the increasing size of mass spectrometry raw-data files, the XML-backed mzML specification does not perform well enough with compressed data. The mzPeak format solves that by saving multiple files in an uncompressed zip file, with the raw data stored in parquet files for fast random access. The structure of the format is heavily inspired by mzML. Its specification is under development, as of September 2026, by HUPO-PSI and interested parties.

== Proprietary formats ==
Below is a table of different file format extensions.

Company or companies	Extension	File type or content
ACD Labs	.spectrus	HD5/JSON based file formats for the Spectrus platform
Agilent Bruker	.D (directory format)	Agilent MassHunter, Agilent ChemStation, or Bruker BAF/YEP/TDF data format
Agilent Bruker	.YEP	instrument data format
Agilent	.AEV, .ASR	ASCII Report format (for Analytical Studio Reviewer)
Bruker	.BAF	instrument data format
Bruker	.FID	instrument data format
Bruker	.TDF	timsTOF instrument data format
ABI/Sciex	.WIFF, .WIFF2	instrument data format
ABI/Sciex	.t2d	4700 and 4800 file format
ABI/Sciex	.dat	Voyager-DE series file format
Waters	.PKL	MassLynx peak list format
Thermo; PerkinElmer	.RAW (Note: Not interchangeable with the RAW formats of other vendors, i.e. each vendor's software handles only its own RAW files, not those produced by other vendors' software.)	Thermo Xcalibur; PerkinElmer TurboMass
Micromass (Note: Acquired by Waters in 1997.) Waters	.RAW (directory format)	Waters MassLynx
Chromtech; Finnigan (Note: A division of the Thermo company.); VG	.DAT	Finnigan ITDS file format; MAT95 instrument data format MassLab data format
Finnigan	.MS	ITS40 instrument data format
Shimadzu	.QGD	GCMSSolution format
Shimadzu	.qgd	instrument data format
Shimadzu	.lcd	QQQ/QTOF instrument data format
Shimadzu	.spc	library data format
Bruker Varian	.SMS	instrument data format
Bruker Varian	.XMS	instrument data format
ION-TOF	.itm	raw measurement data
ION-TOF	.ita	analysis data
Physical Electronics ULVAC-PHI	.raw	raw measurement data
Physical Electronics ULVAC-PHI	.tdc	spectrum data

== Software ==
=== Viewers ===
There are several viewers for mzXML, mzML and mzData, some of which are free and open-source software (FOSS), while others are proprietary and internal-source software (PISS).

In the FOSS viewer category, one can find MZmine, mineXpert2 (mzXML, mzML, native timsTOF, xy, MGF, BafAscii) MS-Spectre, TOPPView (mzXML, mzML and mzData), Spectra Viewer, SeeMS, msInspect and jmzML.

In the PISS viewer category, one can find PEAKS, Insilicos, Mascot Distiller and Elsci Peaksel.

There is also one viewer for ITA images, which (along with ITM images) can be parsed with the help of the pySPM Python library.

=== Converters ===
Known converters for mzData to mzXML:

Hermes: A Java "mzData, mzXML, mzML" converter to all directions: publicly available, runs with a graphical user interface, by the Institute of Molecular Systems Biology, ETH Zurich
FileConverter: A command line tool that converts to/from various mass spectrometry formats, part of TOPP

Known converters for mzXML:

The Institute for Systems Biology maintains a list of converters

Known converters for mzML:

msConvert: A command line tool converting to/from various mass spectrometry formats. A GUI is also available for Windows users.
ReAdW: The Institute for Systems Biology command line converter for Thermo RAW files, part of the TransProteomicPipeline. The latest update of this tool was made in September 2009. Users are now redirected by the TPP development team to use the msConvert software (see above).
FileConverter: A command line tool that converts to/from various mass spectrometry formats, part of TOPP

Converters for proprietary formats:

msConvert: A command line tool converting to/from various mass spectrometry formats including multiple proprietary formats. A GUI is also available for Windows users.
CompassXport, Bruker's free tool generating mzXML (and now mzData) files for many of their native file formats (.baf).
MASSTransit, a software to change data between proprietary formats, by Palisade Corporation and distributed by Scientific Instrument Services, Inc and PerkinElmer. Purchased from Palisade by John Wiley and Sons in 2020 and incorporated into KnowItAll Spectroscopy software.(list of file formats supported).
Aston, native support for several Agilent Chemstation, Agilent Masshunter and Thermo Isodat file formats
unfinnigan, native support for Finnigan (*.RAW) file formats
OpenChrom, an open source software with support to convert various native file formats including its own open .ocb format to store chromatograms, peaks and identification results

Currently available converters are :

MassWolf, for Micromass MassLynx .Raw format
mzStar, for SCIEX/ABI SCIEX/ABI Analyst format
wiff2dta for SCIEX/ABI SCIEX/ABI Analyst format to mzXML, DTA, MGF and PMF

== See also ==
- Mass spectrometry software
