= PEAKS =

Mass spectrometry proteomic analysis software suite

PEAKS Studio
- Developer: Bioinformatics Solutions Inc.
- Stable release: 13.5 / 13 June 2026; 5 months ago
- Operating system: Windows 10+
- Type: Scientific software
- License: Proprietary commercial software
- Website: www.bioinfor.com/peaks-studio

PEAKS Online
- Developer: Bioinformatics Solutions Inc.
- Stable release: 13.5 / 24 June 2026; 4 months ago
- Operating system: Windows, Linux
- Type: Scientific software
- License: Proprietary commercial software
- Website: www.bioinfor.com/peaks-online

PEAKS is a suite of software programs designed for proteomic analysis of data obtained from mass spectrometers. Products within the suite include PEAKS Studio, PEAKS Online, PEAKS AB, and PEAKS GlycanFinder.

The PEAKS suit of proteomics software are commonly used for peptide identification (protein ID) through de novo peptide sequencing assisted search engine database searching, with protein quantification capabilities whilst also giving reproducible results. PEAKS has also integrated PTM and mutation characterization through automatic peptide sequence tag based searching (SPIDER) and PTM identification. PEAKS supports analysis of DDA, DIA, hybrid-DIA, MRM, and PRM data with various workflows.

== Overview ==
PEAKS Studio is a proteomics software program for bottom-up proteomics data collected by LC-MS and MS/MS designed for peptide sequencing, protein identification and quantification on desktop and workstation computers.

PEAKS Online is a collaboration-based proteomics software designed for at-scale operation on servers and computer clusters.

PEAKS is well-known for offering automated de novo sequencing with two algorithms, the PEAKS de novo algorithm, and the DeepNovo algorithm. The PEAKS de novo algorithm uses the mass difference between two fragment ions to calculate the mass of an amino acid residue on the peptide backbone. The mass can usually uniquely determine the residue. DeepNovo, under the current implementation GraphNovo, is a deep learning based approach towards de novo sequencing. Decoy spectra are used in DeepNovo to estimate an FDR for de novo peptide sequencing. The decoy generation process ensures decoy spectra have the same fragment ion distribution as target spectra. PEAKS provides a complete sequence for each peptide, with confidence scores on individual amino acid assignments, simple reporting for high-throughput analysis, amongst other information.

To identify modifications and mutations, PEAKS uses two algorithms: SPIDER and PTM Search. SPIDER is a sequence tag based search tool within PEAKS, which deals with the possible overlaps between the de novo sequencing errors and the homology mutations. It reconstructs the real peptide sequence by combining both the de novo sequence tag and the homolog, automatically and efficiently. PTM Search is a tool within PEAKS that provides PTM identification and profiling by de novo sequencing and database searching.

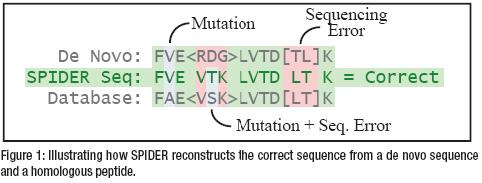

Protein quantification can be done using the add-on tool PEAKS Q. It supports label (ICAT, iTRAQ, SILAC, TMT, 018, etc.) and label free techniques. Protein relative quantification is performed based on the extracted ion chromatograms of the whole isotopic envelope on MS1 level. Additionally, the LFQ algorithm extracts and uses the LC retention time and MS feature to align different runs, thus transferring IDs to matched features without IDs to retrieve quantification information.

IMS-MS data analysis is supported with the PEAKS IMS add-on tool, which offers an additional dimension of separation when used with LC-MS/MS spectrometry.

PEAKS QC is a tool within PEAKS that provides automated quality control of results obtained from analyses. QC allows for the assessment of statistical information of the raw data and results, which can provide more information on the attributes of the LC-MS acquisition.

Many algorithms and features of PEAKS Studio and PEAKS Online have been adapted and developed into multiple other software in the PEAKS suite. This list includes PEAKS AB, the first method for automatic monoclonal antibody sequencing; PEAKS GlycanFinder, a project focused on glycan profiling and identification; and ProteoformX, capable of intact and top-down proteomic mass analysis.

== Uses in Proteomics ==
The software is used in proteomics research for the analysis and interpretation of mass spectrometry data. Applications include protein identification, peptide quantification, post translation modifications (PTM) analysis, and computer proteomics.

The software has been used in biomarker discoveries, clinical and pre-clinical proteomics, cancer proteomics, plant proteomics, pharmaceutical research, and systems biology. The software can be used to interpret these data sets by feature extraction and identification from raw data.

DIA data analysis, available in PEAKS software, supports the identification of peptides that are highly differentiated and are presented in low quantities. DIA captures MS2 spectra of low abundance peptides, and the use of a spectral library and de novo peptide sequencing workflow is Incorporated to identify peptides from mass spectrometry data.

Protein, peptide, etc. databases in .fasta format from sources such as Uniprot and PRIDE can be used with PEAKS. Mass spectrometry data and workflows generated by instruments and software from a multitude of vendors is possible as PEAKS is vendor neutral software. Examples include ThermoFisher Scientific (e.g XCalibur), Sciex (e.g SCIEX MS Data Converter Software) Bruker (e.g Bruker DataAnalysis) and Agilent (e.g MassHunter or OpenLab).
