= OpenMS =

- Developer: Over 65 individuals
- Release: 1 July 2007; 18 years ago
- Stable release: 3.2.0 / 18 September 2024; 21 months ago
- Written in: C++ (with bindings to Python)
- Operating system: Linux, Windows, MacOS
- Platform: x86-64, ARM
- Size: 215 MB
- Available in: English
- Type: Bioinformatics / Mass spectrometry software
- License: BSD licenses 3-clause
- Website: openms.de
- Repository: github.com/OpenMS/OpenMS

OpenMS is an open-source project for data analysis and processing in mass spectrometry and is released under the 3-clause BSD licence. It supports most common operating systems including Microsoft Windows, MacOS and Linux.

OpenMS has tools for analysis of proteomics data, providing algorithms for signal processing, feature finding (including de-isotoping), visualization in 1D (spectra or chromatogram level), 2D and 3D, map mapping and peptide identification. It supports label-free and isotopic-label based quantification (such as iTRAQ and TMT and SILAC). OpenMS also supports metabolomics workflows and targeted analysis of DIA/SWATH data. Furthermore, OpenMS provides tools for the analysis of cross linking data, including protein-protein, protein-RNA and protein-DNA cross linking. Lastly, OpenMS provides tools for analysis of RNA mass spectrometry data.

== History ==
OpenMS was originally released in 2007 in version 1.0 and was described in two articles published in Bioinformatics in 2007 and 2008 and has since seen continuous releases. In 2009, the visualization tool TOPPView was published and in 2012, the workflow manager and editor TOPPAS was described. In 2013, a complete high-throughput label-free analysis pipeline using OpenMS 1.8 was described and compared with similar, proprietary software (such as MaxQuant and Progenesis QI). The authors conclude that "[...] all three software solutions produce adequate and largely comparable quantification results; all have some weaknesses, and none can outperform the other two in every aspect that we examined. However, the performance of OpenMS is on par with that of its two tested competitors [...]".

The OpenMS 1.10 release contained several new analysis tools, including OpenSWATH (a tool for targeted DIA data analysis), a metabolomics feature finder and a TMT analysis tool. Furthermore, full support for TraML 1.0.0 and the search engine MyriMatch were added. The OpenMS 1.11 release was the first release to contain fully integrated bindings to the Python programming language (termed pyOpenMS). In addition, new tools were added to support QcML (for quality control) and for metabolomics accurate mass analysis. Multiple tools were significantly improved with regard to memory and CPU performance.

With OpenMS 2.0, released in April 2015, the project provides a new version that has been completely cleared of GPL code and uses git (in combination with GitHub) for its version control and ticketing system. Other changes include support for mzIdentML, mzQuantML and mzTab while improvements in the kernel allow for faster access to data stored in mzML and provide a novel API for accessing mass spectrometric data. In 2016, the new features of OpenMS 2.0 were described in an article in Nature Methods.

In 2024, OpenMS 3.0 was released, providing support for a wide array of data analysis task in proteomics, metabolomics and MS-based transcriptomics.

OpenMS is currently developed with contributions from the group of Knut Reinert at the Free University of Berlin, the group of Oliver Kohlbacher at the University of Tübingen and the group of Hannes Roest at University of Toronto.

== Features ==
OpenMS provides a set of over 100 different executable tools than can be chained together into pipelines for mass spectrometry data analysis (the TOPP Tools). It also provides visualization tools for spectra and chromatograms (1D), mass spectrometric heat maps (2D m/z vs RT) as well as a three-dimensional visualization of a mass spectrometry experiment. Finally, OpenMS also provides a C++ library (with bindings to Python available since 1.11) for LC/MS data management and analyses accessible to developers to create new tools and implement their own algorithms using the OpenMS library. OpenMS is free software available under the 3-clause BSD licence (previously under the LGPL).

Among others, it provides algorithms for signal processing, feature finding (including de-isotoping), visualization, map mapping and peptide identification. It supports label-free and isotopic-label based quantification (such as iTRAQ and TMT and SILAC).

The following graphical applications are part an OpenMS release:

- TOPPView is a viewer that allows visualization of mass spectrometric data on MS1 and MS2 level as well as in 3D; additionally it also displays chromatographic data from SRM experiments (in version 1.10). OpenMS is compatible with current and upcoming Proteomics Standard Initiative (PSI) formats for mass spectrometric data.
- TOPPAS is a graphical application to build and execute data processing pipelines which consist of TOPP tools.

== Releases ==
Version	Date	Features
1.6.0	November 2009	New version of TOPPAS, reading of compressed XML files, identification-based alignment
1.7.0	September 2010	Protein quantification, protXML support, create Inclusion/Exclusion lists
1.8.0	March 2011	Display identification results, QT Clustering-based feature linking
1.9.0	February 2012	metabolomics support, feature detection in raw (profile) data
1.10.0	March 2013	KNIME integration, support for targeted SWATH-MS analysis, TraML support, SuperHirn integration, MyriMatch support
1.11.0	August 2013	Support for Python bindings, performance improvements, Mascot 2.4 support
2.0	April 2015	mzQuantL, mzIdentML, mzTab, indexed mzML, Removal of GPL code, Switch to git, Support for Fido, MSGF+, Percolator
2.0.1	April 2016	faster file reading, improved support for mzIdentML and mzTab, elemental flux analysis, targeted assay generation, Support for Comet and Luciphor
2.1.0	November 2016	Metabolite SWATH-MS support, lowess-transformations for RT alignment, improved metabolic feature finding
2.2.0	July 2017	Fast feature linking using a KD tree, RNA cross-linking support, SpectraST support, scanning SWATH support, SQLite file formats
2.3.0	January 2018	Protein-Protein Crosslinking, support for Comet, support for fractions, TMT 11plex, improved build for Python bindings
2.4.0	October 2018	Support MaraCluster, Crux, MSFragger, MSstats, SIRIUS, visualization of ion mobility and DIA, library improvements
2.5.0	February 2020	Support RNA mass spectrometry, QualityControl workflow, extended OpenSWATH support, ProteomicsLFQ
2.6.0	September 2020	PyOpenMS wheel builds, Database suitability tool, SLIM labelling support
2.7.0	July 2021	Improved support of NOVOR and MSFragger and for SIRIUS 4.9.0, export of mzQC format in QCCalculator, improved reading and writing of NIST MSP files
3.1.0	July 2023	Added FLASHDeconv, and FLASHDeconvWizard GUI. Removed obsolete tool adapters. Major improvements to documentation.
3.1.0	October 2023	Added SageAdapter; Require some advanced instruction sets (SSE3, AVX, Neon). Documentation fixes (TOPPAS and developer tutorial).
3.2.0	September 2024	Support SubsetNeighborSearch (SNS). SiriusAdapter reworked. Various improvements to TOPPView and TOPPAS. Export for Common Workflow Language (CWL).

Unsupported
Supported
Latest version
Future version

== See also ==
- ProteoWizard
- Trans-Proteomic Pipeline
- Mass spectrometry software
