= OpenChrom =

Cross-platform open source software for chromatography and mass spectrometry

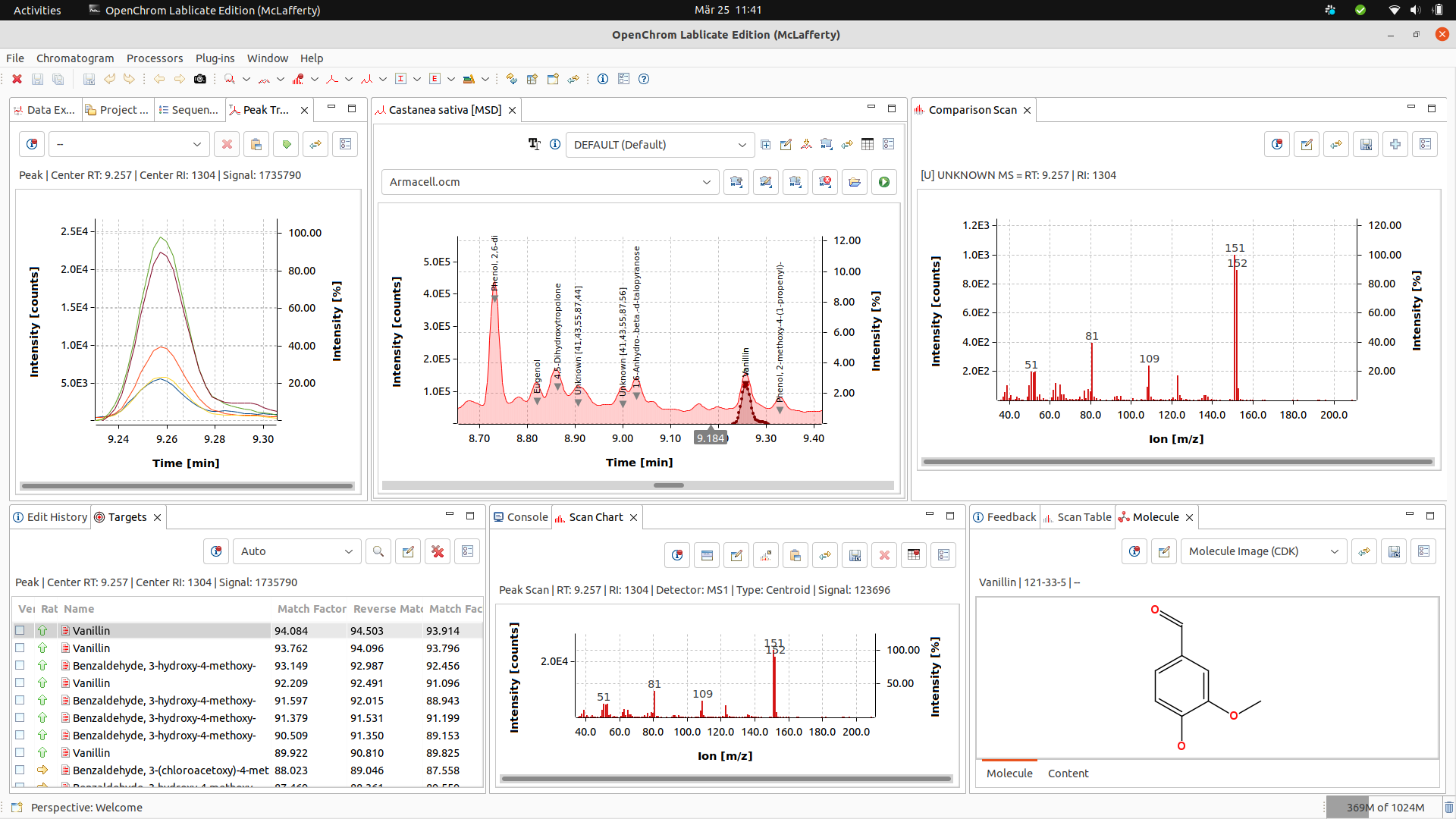
- Screenshot of OpenChrom version 1.5.0 "McLafferty"
- Developers: Lablicate & Scientific community
- Stable release: 1.6
- Written in: Java
- Operating system: Cross-platform
- Type: Chemoinformatics/Bioinformatics
- License: EPL, Third-party libraries under various OSI compatible licenses
- Website: www.openchrom.net

OpenChrom is an open source software for the analysis and visualization of mass spectrometric and chromatographic data. Its focus is to handle native data files from several mass spectrometry systems (e.g. GC/MS, LC/MS, Py-GC/MS, HPLC-MS), vendors like Agilent Technologies, Varian, Shimadzu, Thermo Fisher, PerkinElmer and others. But also data formats from other detector types are supported recently.

OpenChrom supports only the analysis and representation of chromatographic and mass spectrometric data. It has no capabilities for data acquisition or control of vendor hardware. OpenChrom is built on the Eclipse Rich Client Platform (RCP), hence it is available for various operating systems, e.g. Microsoft Windows, macOS and Linux. It is distributed under the Eclipse Public License 1.0 (EPL). Third-party libraries are separated into single bundles and are released under various OSI compatible licenses.

== History ==
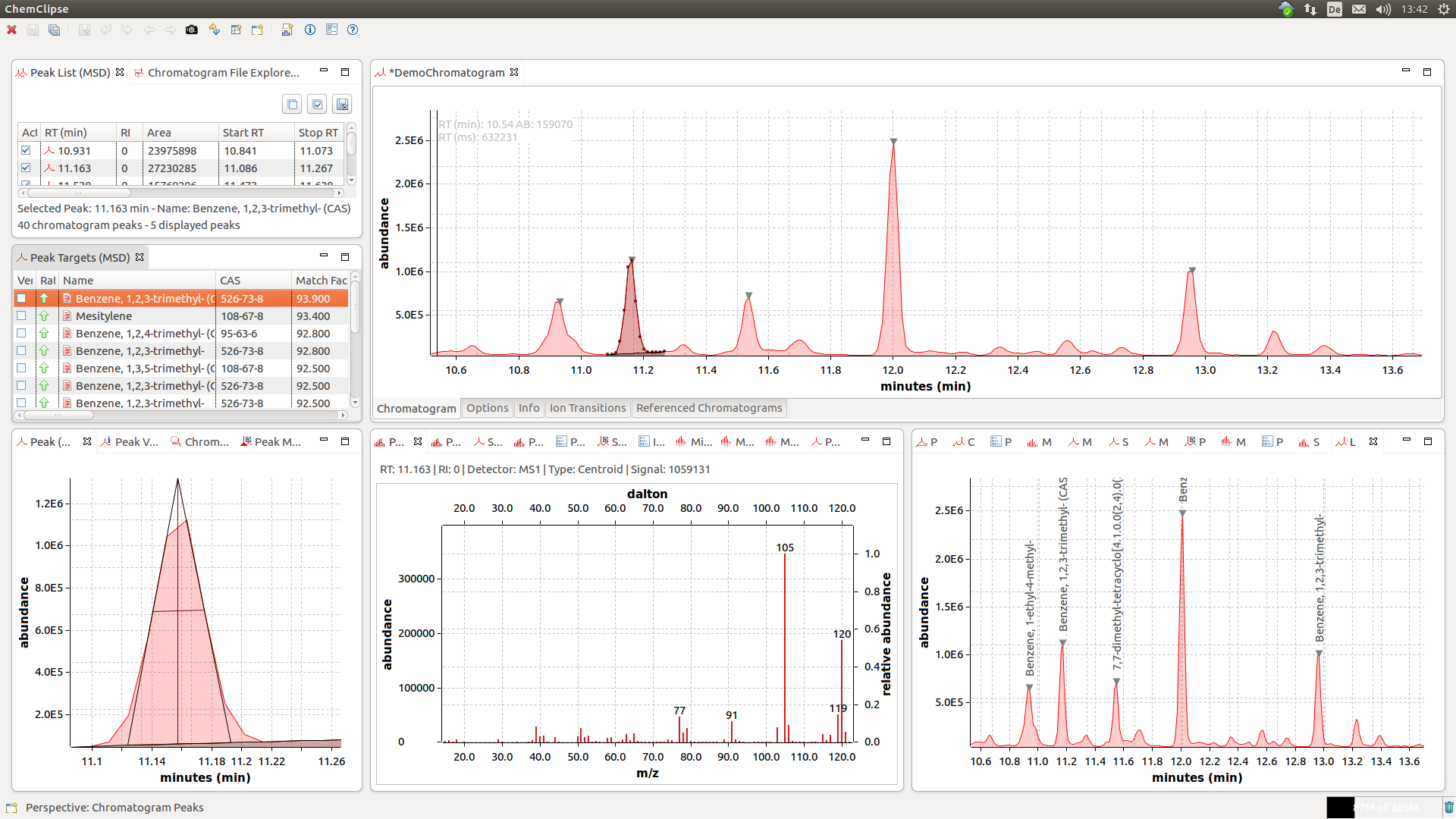
ChemClipse version 0.7.0

OpenChrom was developed by Philip Wenig as part of his PhD thesis at the University of Hamburg, Germany. The focus of the thesis was to apply pattern recognition techniques on datasets recorded by analytical pyrolysis coupled with chromatography and mass spectrometry (Py-GC/MS).

OpenChrom won the Thomas Krenn Open Source Award 2010 as well as the Eclipse Community Award 2011. The developers are also founding members of the Eclipse Science Working Group. After successful commercialization of contract development and services around the OpenChrom project, vendor Lablicate reinforced the commitment to Free/Libre/Open-Source Software with the release of ChemClipse in October 2016, which serves as the base for all OpenChrom products.

== Supported data formats ==
Each system vendor stores the recorded analysis data in its own proprietary format. That makes it difficult to compare data sets from different systems and vendors. Furthermore, it's a big drawback for interlaboratory tests. The aim of OpenChrom is to support a wide range of different mass spectrometry data formats natively. OpenChrom takes care that the raw data files can't be modified according to the good laboratory practice. To help scientists OpenChrom supports several open formats to import and export the analysis results. In addition, OpenChrom offers its own open source format (*.ocb) that makes it possible to save the edited chromatogram as well as the peaks and identification results.

=== Mass selective detector ===
- Agilent ChemStation *.D (DATA.MS and MSD1.MS)
- AMDIS Library (*.msl)
- Bruker Flex MALDI-MS (*.fid)
- Chromtech (*.dat)
- CSV (*.csv)
- Finnigan (*.RAW)
- Finnigan MAT95 (*.dat)
- Finnigan ITDS (*.DAT)
- Finnigan ITS40 (*.MS)
- Finnigan Element II (*.dat)
- JCAMP-DX (*.JDX)
- Microsoft Excel (*.xlsx)
- mzXML (*.mzXML)
- mzData (*.mzData)
- NetCDF (*.CDF)
- NIST Text (*.msp)
- Open Chromatography Binary (*.ocb)
- Peak Loadings (*.mpl)
- PerkinElmer (*.raw)
- Varian SMS (*.SMS)
- Varian XMS (*.XMS)
- VG MassLab (*.DAT_001;1)
- Shimadzu (*.qgd)
- Shimadzu (*.spc)
- Waters (*.RAW)
- ZIP (*.zip)
- Agilent ICP-MS (*.icp)
- Finnigan ICIS (*.dat)
- mzML (*.mzML)
- mzMLb (*.mzMLb)
- mz5 (*.mz5)
- mzDB (*.mzDB)
- SVG (*.svg)
- MassHunter (*.D)
- Finnigan ICIS (*.dat)
- MassLynx (*.RAW)
- Galactic Grams (*.cgm)
- AnIML (*.animl)
- GAML (*.gaml)
- ...

=== Flame ionization detector ===
- Agilent FID (*.D/*.ch)
- FID Text (*.xy)
- NetCDF (*.cdf)
- PerkinElmer (*.raw)
- Varian (*.run)
- Finnigan FID (*.dat)
- Finnigan FID (*.raw)
- Shimadzu (*.gcd)
- Arw (*.arw)
- AnIML (*.animl)
- GAML (*.gaml)
- ...

=== Diode-array detection ===
- Agilent DAD (*.UV/*.ch)
- ABSciex
- Chromulan
- Shimadzu (*.lcd)
- Waters Empower
- AnIML (*.animl)

=== Fourier-transform infrared spectroscopy ===
- Thermo Galactics (*.spc)
- Thermo Fisher Nicolet (*.spa)
- GAML (*.gaml)

=== Near-infrared spectroscopy ===
- Bruker OPUS (*.0)

=== Other formats ===
- Peak Loadings (*.mpl)
- NIST-DB (*.msp)
- AMDIS (*.msl)
- AMDIS (*.cal)
- AMDIS (*.ELU)
- MassBank (*.txt)
- SIRIUS (*.ms)

== Major features ==
OpenChrom offers a variety of features to analyze chromatographic data:

- Native handling of chromatographic data (MSD and FID)
- Batch processing support
- Baseline detector support
- Peak detector, integrator support
- Peak deconvolution
- Peaks and mass spectrum identifier support
- Quantitation support
- Filter support (e.g. Mass Fragment and Scan Removal, noise reduction, Savitzky–Golay smoothing, CODA, backfolding)
- Retention time shift support
- Retention index support
- Chromatogram overlay mode
- Support for principal component analysis (PCA)
- Do/undo/redo support
- Integration of OpenOffice/LibreOffice and Microsoft Office
- Extensible by plug-ins
- Chromatogram peak pattern analysis
- Chromatogram and peak database support
- Update support
- Subtract mass spectra support

== Releases ==
The software was first released in 2010. Each release is named after a renowned scientist. Within each major version weekly new releases are published.

Codename	Eponym	Date	Version
Thomson	Joseph John Thomson	April 2010	0.1.0
Goldstein	Eugen Goldstein	May 2010	0.2.0
Wien	Wilhelm Wien	October 2010	0.3.0
Tswett	Mikhail Semyonovich Tswett	April 2011	0.4.0
Martin	Archer John Porter Martin	October 2011	0.5.0
Synge	Richard L. M. Synge	April 2012	0.6.0
Nernst	Walther Nernst	October 2012	0.7.0
Dempster	Arthur Jeffrey Dempster	July 2013	0.8.0
Mattauch	Josef Mattauch	July 2014	0.9.0
Aston	Francis William Aston	July 2015	1.0.0
Diels	Otto Diels	July 2016	1.1.0
Alder	Kurt Alder	August 2017	1.2.0
Dalton	John Dalton	August 2018	1.3.0
Lawrence	Ernest Lawrence	August 2019	1.4.0
McLafferty	Fred McLafferty	March 2022	1.5.0
Hillenkamp	Franz Hillenkamp	January 2026	1.6.0

Unsupported
Supported
Latest version
Future version
