= CompTox Chemicals Dashboard =

Chemical database

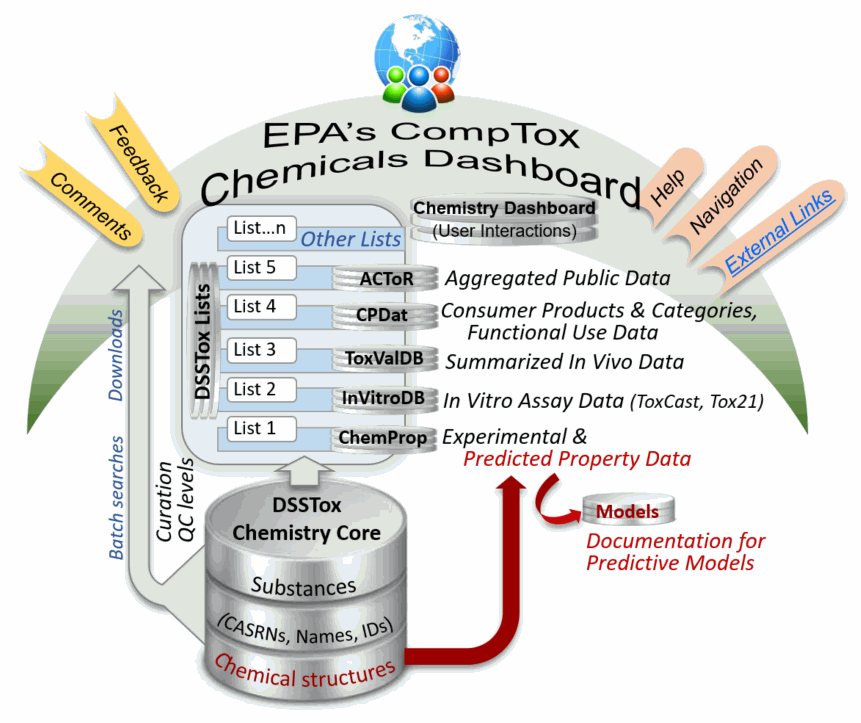

Content
- Description: Chemicals database targeted towards the environmental sciences and providing access to over 875,000 chemical compounds, properties, bioassay data and associated information.

Contact
- Research center: Environmental Protection Agency
- Laboratory: National Center for Computational Toxicology
- Primary citation: The CompTox Chemistry Dashboard: a community data resource for environmental chemistry.

Access
- Website: comptox.epa.gov/dashboard
- Download URL: comptox.epa.gov/dashboard/downloads

Miscellaneous
- License: Public Domain
- Data release frequency: Every 6 months
- Curation policy: Manually curated

The CompTox Chemicals Dashboard is a freely accessible online database created and maintained by the U.S. Environmental Protection Agency (EPA). The database provides access to multiple types of data including physicochemical properties, environmental fate and transport, exposure, usage, in vivo toxicity, and in vitro bioassay. EPA and other scientists use the data and models contained within the dashboard to help identify chemicals that require further testing and reduce the use of animals in chemical testing. The Dashboard is also used to provide public access to information from EPA Action Plans, e.g. around perfluorinated alkylated substances.

Originally titled the Chemistry Dashboard, the first version was released in 2016. The latest release of the database (version 3.0.5) contains manually curated data for over 875,000 chemicals and incorporates the latest data generated from the EPA's Toxicity Forecaster (ToxCast) high-throughput screening program. The Chemicals Dashboard incorporates data from several previous EPA databases into one package including the ToxCast Dashboard, the Endocrine Disruption Screening Program (EDSP) Dashboard and the Chemical and Products Database (CPDat).

== Scope and access ==
The CompTox Chemicals Dashboard database contains high quality chemical structures and information that have been extensively curated and quality checked, which can be used as a resource for analytical scientists involved in structure identification.

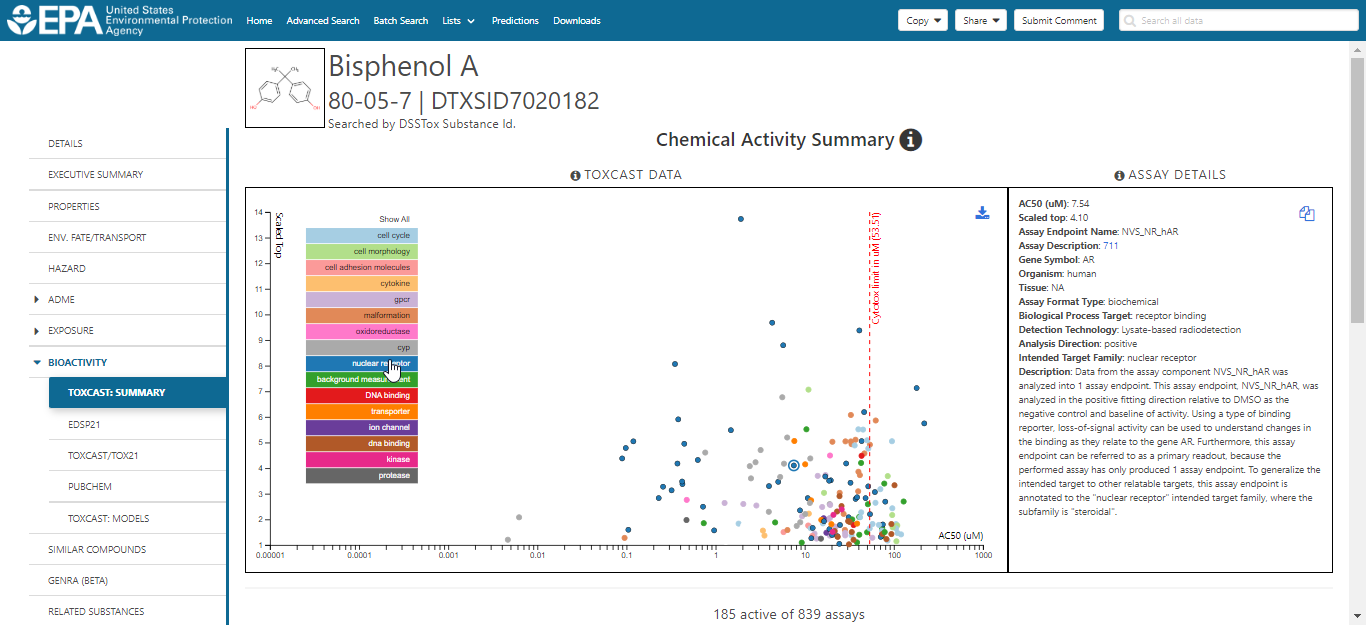
ToxCast bioactivity data view for Bisphenol A

Chemical hazard data in the dashboard comes from both traditional laboratory animal studies and high-throughput screening. Biological data from high-throughput screening is generated by EPA's ToxCast program, the ToxCast data in the database provides information about the assays used and their response potency and efficacy. These data can be found in the bioactivity tab.

The Chemicals Dashboard can be accessed via a web interface or sets of data within it can be downloaded for use offline. The Lists tab can be used to browse and download groups of related chemicals based on their relevance to a specific research topic (such as additives in cigarettes or chemicals demonstrating effects on neurodevelopmental effects) or the specific assay endpoints they are covered by.

Within the online dashboard searches can be performed by product/use categories, assay/gene, systematic name, synonym, CAS number, DSSTox Substance ID or InChiKey. Under the Advanced Search tab chemicals can be searched based on their mass or molecular formula. Searches can also be performed for groups of chemicals based on Chemical Name CASRN, InChIKey, DSSTox Substance ID, DSSTox Compound ID, InChIKey Skeleton, MS-Ready Formula, Exact Formula, or Monoisotopic Mass using the batch search function.

== Other functions ==
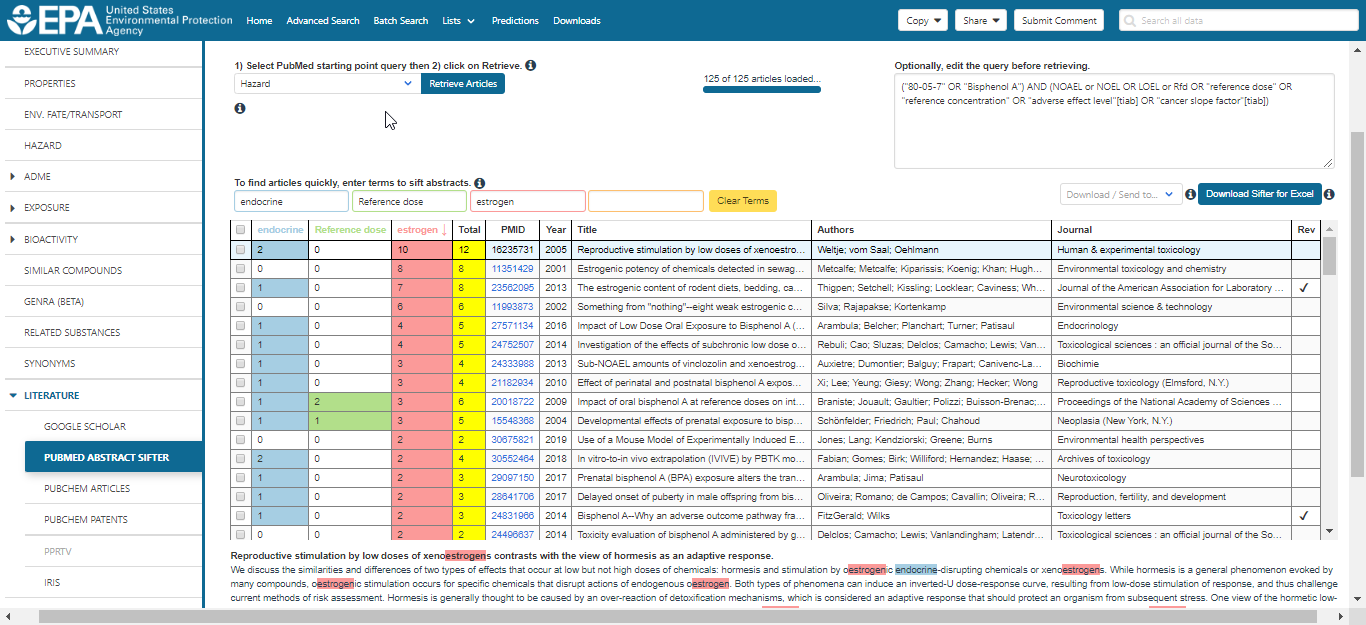
Abstract Sifter module

An automated read-across tool called Generalized Read-Across (GenRA) is integrated into the Chemicals Dashboard. GenRA is designed to keep the expert consideration inherent in the read-across method, but automate the chemical selection process to help predict toxicity.

The Dashboard also has the capability to search existing scientific literature sources such as PubMed, via a web-based version of the "Abstract Sifter", Google Scholar and reports from EPA's Provisional Peer Reviewed Toxicity Values (PPRTV) and the EPA Integrated Risk Information System (IRIS).

Real-time QSAR prediction for multiple physicochemical property and toxicity endpoints is available through the predictions tab.

== Supporting mass spectrometry ==
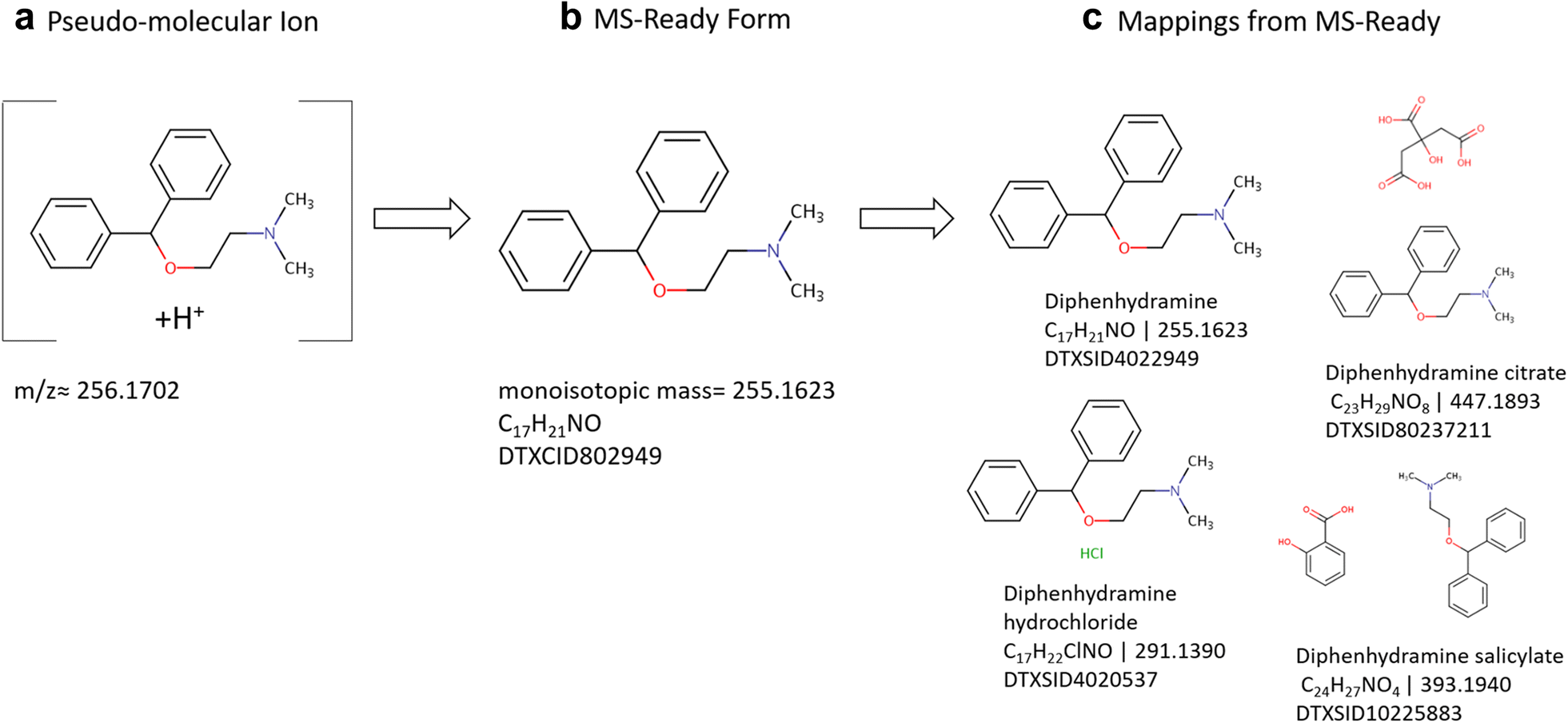
MS-Ready relationships

The dashboard provides support for mass spectrometry providing searches against the chemical data contained in the database based on mass and molecular formula. The dashboard has been applied to non-targeted analysis searching for "known unknowns". Both targeted mass spectrometry and non-targeted mass spectrometry are supported. The searches utilize a search based on "MS-Ready" forms of chemical compounds. Individual chemical substances are collapsed into a form that would be detected by mass spectrometry such that salts are desalted and neutralized and multi-component chemicals are separated into their individual components.

== See also ==
- ChEMBL
- PubChem
- Chemical database
- Environmental science
- Environmental informatics
