= Pyrolysis–gas chromatography–mass spectrometry =

Method of chemical analysis

- Acronym: PyGCMS
- Classification: Mass spectrometry
- Analytes: polymers biomolecules paint

Other techniques
- Related: gas chromatography

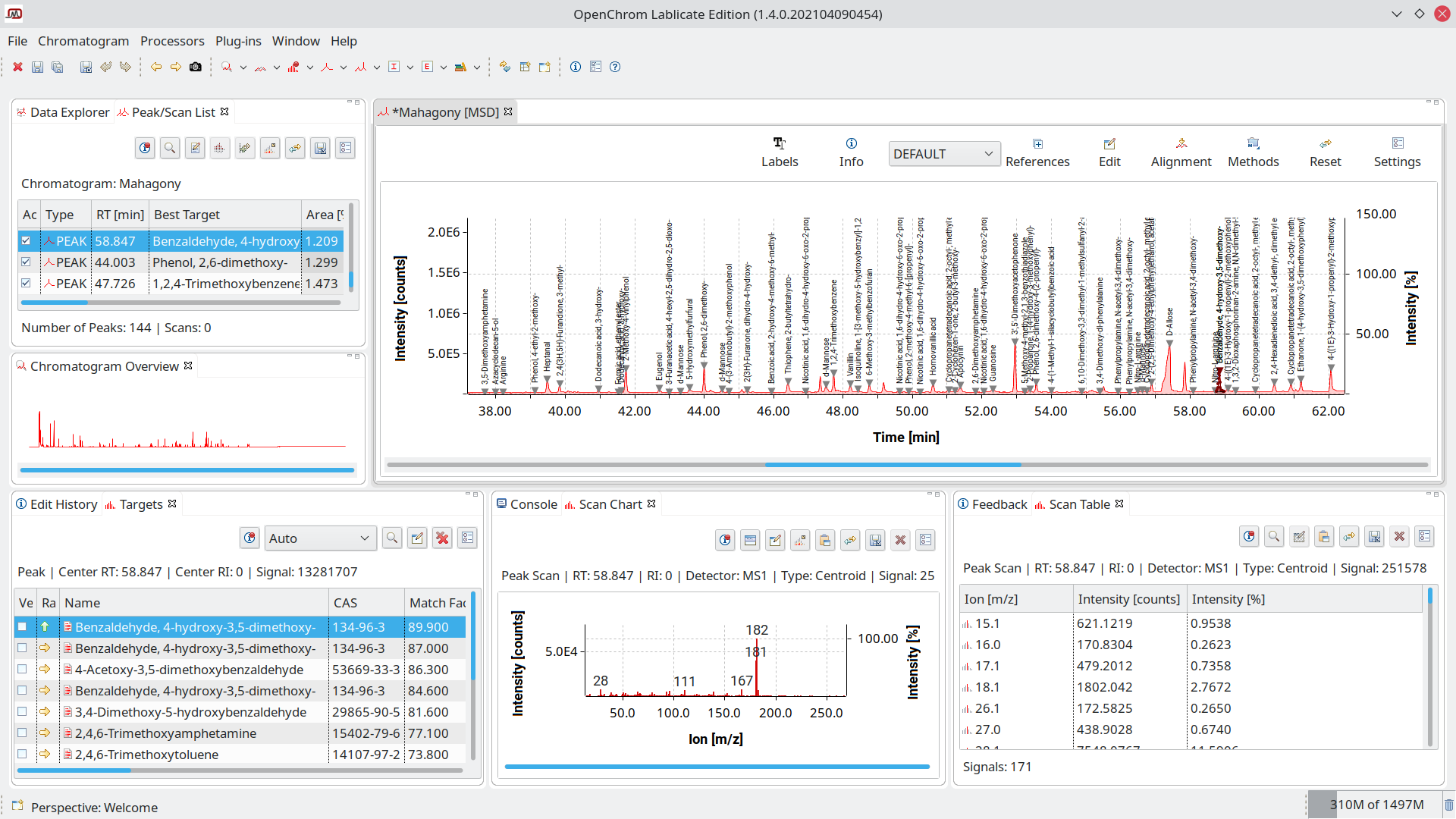
Pyrolysis GC/MS chromatogram of mahogany wood analyzed with OpenChrom

Pyrolysis–gas chromatography–mass spectrometry is a method of chemical analysis in which the sample is heated to decomposition to produce smaller molecules that are separated by gas chromatography and detected using mass spectrometry.

== How it works ==
Pyrolysis is the thermal decomposition of materials in an inert atmosphere or a vacuum. The sample is put into direct contact with a platinum wire, or placed in a quartz sample tube, and rapidly heated to 600–1000 °C. Depending on the application even higher temperatures are used. Three different heating techniques are used in actual pyrolyzers: Isothermal furnace, inductive heating (Curie Point filament), and resistive heating using platinum filaments. Large molecules cleave at their weakest bonds, producing smaller, more volatile fragments. These fragments can be separated by gas chromatography. Pyrolysis GC chromatograms are typically complex because a wide range of different decomposition products is formed. The data can either be used as fingerprint to prove material identity or the GC/MS data is used to identify individual fragments to obtain structural information.
To increase the volatility of polar fragments, various methylating reagents can be added to a sample before pyrolysis.

Besides the usage of dedicated pyrolyzers, pyrolysis GC of solid and liquid samples can be performed directly inside programmable temperature vaporizer (PTV) injectors that provide quick heating (up to 60 °C/s) and high maximum temperatures of 600-650 °C. This is sufficient for many pyrolysis applications. The main advantage is that no dedicated instrument has to be purchased and pyrolysis can be performed as part of routine GC analysis. In this case quartz GC inlet liners can be used. Quantitative data can be acquired, and good results of derivatization inside the PTV injector are published as well.

== Applications ==
Pyrolysis gas chromatography is useful for the identification of involatile compounds. These materials include polymeric materials, such as acrylics or alkyds. The way in which the polymer fragments, before it is separated in the GC, can help in identification. Pyrolysis gas chromatography is also used for environmental samples, including fossil analysis and microplastic detection. Pyrolysis GC is used in forensic laboratories to analyze evidence found in crime scenes such as paints, adhesives, plastics, synthetic fibres and soil extracts.
