= Allotrope Foundation =

The Allotrope Foundation
- Formation: 2012
- Headquarters: Washington, DC
- Website: www.allotrope.org

The Allotrope Foundation is a consortium of pharmaceutical companies, instrument vendors and software companies to simplify the exchange of scientific electronic data. It publishes the Allotrope Foundation Ontology (AFO) which is a controlled vocabulary to structure data, the Allotrope Data Models (ADM) and the Allotrope Data Format (ADF) based on HDF5 which incorporates those for use in practice. Standardization aims at the goal of FAIR data.

== Members ==
Foundation members are Amgen, BASF, Bayer, Boehringer Ingelheim, Dow Chemical Company, Genentech, GSK plc, Johnson & Johnson, Merck & Co.. The partner network consists of ACD Labs, Agilent Technologies, Benchling, Bio-Rad Laboratories, BIOVIA, Brigham Young University, Bruker, Ganymede, J. Paul Getty Trust, HDF Group, IUTA, IFP Énergies nouvelles, Lablicate, Paris Dauphine University National Physical Laboratory (United Kingdom) SCIEX, Shimadzu Thermo Fisher Scientific, University of Strathclyde, Waters Corporation, United States Pharmacopeia, Applied Graphs, Erasmus MC, Fraunhofer IPA, Gustavus Adolphus College, NIST, ScienceOS, Stanford University, Texas Tech University, Technical University of Dortmund, University of Cambridge, University of Illinois Chicago, University of Michigan and University of Southampton.
