= Markes International =

- Company type: Private
- Industry: Scientific Instruments Manufacturing
- Founded: 1997; 29 years ago
- Founders: Elizabeth Woolfenden; Alun Cole
- Headquarters: Bridgend, Wales, United Kingdom
- Number of locations: 5
- Key people: Nigel Fry (CEO)
- Products: Thermal Desorbers; Centri; Sampling Devices; Consumables
- Parent: Velaris
- Website: markes.com

Markes International is a manufacturer and supplier of specialist analytical instrumentation that enhances the sensitivity and application scope of GC–MS. They also manufacture and supply complementary sampling devices, accessories, and consumables.

Markes International was founded in 1997. Their first thermal desorption instrument, the UNITY, was released shortly thereafter. The company has since updated and expanded their instrument portfolio, including a wider range of thermal desorbers, and Centri, a range of automated sample preparation and pre-concentration platforms.

Markes’ factory, technical centre and headquarters is in Bridgend, Wales, UK. In 2011, they expanded this and their US operations (Markes International, Inc.) - adding extra laboratory and demonstration facilities. In 2017 their US operations transferred from Cincinnati, Ohio, to a new office in Gold River, Sacramento, California.

In 2013, Markes became a company of the Schauenburg International Group, and opened a technical centre near Frankfurt as part of their German operations (Markes International GmbH).

The company has arrangements for distribution and market development with Agilent Technologies, ThermoFisher Scientific, and a number of other distributors.

Markes International holds patents for a number of technological innovations, including diffusion-locking caps and inserts for sorbent tubes, RFID tags for sorbent tubes, and a soft electron ionisation source.

The company received the Queen's Award for Enterprise in the 'International Trade' category in 2015 and 2019, and was also honoured in the 'Innovation' category in 2019.

== See also ==
- Thermal desorption
- Gas chromatography
