= ProteoWizard =

Mass spectrometry software in proteomics

- Initial release: 14 March 2008; 17 years ago
- Stable release: 3.0
- Repository: github.com/ProteoWizard/pwiz
- Written in: C++, C#
- Operating system: Windows, (partial support for OS X and Linux)
- Type: Bioinformatics / Mass spectrometry software
- License: Apache license 2.0
- Website: proteowizard.sourceforge.net

ProteoWizard is a set of open-source, cross-platform tools and libraries for proteomics data analyses. It provides a framework for unified mass spectrometry data file access and performs standard chemistry and LCMS dataset computations. Specifically, it is able to read many of the vendor-specific, proprietary formats and converting the data into an open data format.

On the application level, the software provides executables for data conversion (msConvert, msConvertGUI and idConvert), data visualization (msPicture and seeMS), data access (msAccess, msCat, idCat and msPicture), data analysis (peekaboo and msPrefix14) and basic proteomics utilities (chainsaw). In addition, the project also hosts the Skyline software which helps to create, acquire and analyze targeted proteomics experiments such as SRM experiments.

The main contributors to the project are the Tabb, MacCoss and Mallick research labs as well as Insilicos.

== See also ==
- OpenMS
- Trans-Proteomic Pipeline
- Mass spectrometry software
- Skyline (software)
