= Targeted mass spectrometry =

Mass spectrometry technique

Targeted mass spectrometry is a mass spectrometry technique that uses multiple stages of tandem mass spectrometry (MS^{n} with n=2 or 3) for ions of specific mass (m/z), at specific time. The values of the m/z and time are defined in an inclusion list which is derived from a previous analysis.

== Applications ==
Targeted analysis allows the thorough analysis of all ions, at all abundance range above the noise level, at any time window in the experiment. In contrast, non-targeted analysis would, typically, only allow detection of the most abundant 50-100 ions over the entire experiment time. Such limitation of non-targeted analysis makes it less suitable for analyzing highly complex, highly dynamic sample such as human blood serum.

However, the methods of utilizing targeted mass spectrometry are still at a primitive stage, in the sense that the inclusion list used in the targeted analysis is typically manually typed-in by scientists. In addition to that, only one inclusion list is allowed for the entire experiment. Such manual process is both labor-intensive and error-prone. This is largely due to the lack of software to control the mass spectrometer.

== Automation ==
There have been some efforts in automating the generation of inclusion lists through the solution of external software. In 2010, Wu et al. introduced a semi-automatic method in an effort of identifying low-abundance glyco-peptide. They implemented the automation through iterative experiments and the open-source software GLYPID. With minor modification, this approach can be used in analyzing any other simple or complex samples. In addition to the advantage mentioned before, this semi-automated approach also saves substantial amount of time and efforts for scientists in manually picking ions and re-calibrating instruments.

== See also ==
- Data-independent acquisition
