= MassMatrix =

MassMatrix is a mass spectrometry data analysis software that uses a statistical model to achieve increased mass accuracy over other database search algorithms. This search engine is set apart from others dues to its ability to provide extremely efficient judgement between true and false positives for high mass accuracy data that has been obtained from present day mass spectrometer instruments. It is useful for identifying disulphide bonds in tandem mass spectrometry data. This search engine is set apart from others due to its ability to provide extremely efficient judgement between true and false positives for high mass accuracy data that has been obtained from present day mass spectrometer instruments.
