= Label-free quantification =

Quantification of biomolecules via mass spectrometry without using chemical labels

Label-free quantification is a method in mass spectrometry that aims to determine the relative amount of proteins in two or more biological samples. Unlike other methods for protein quantification, label-free quantification does not use a stable isotope containing compound to chemically bind to and thus label the protein.

== Implementation ==
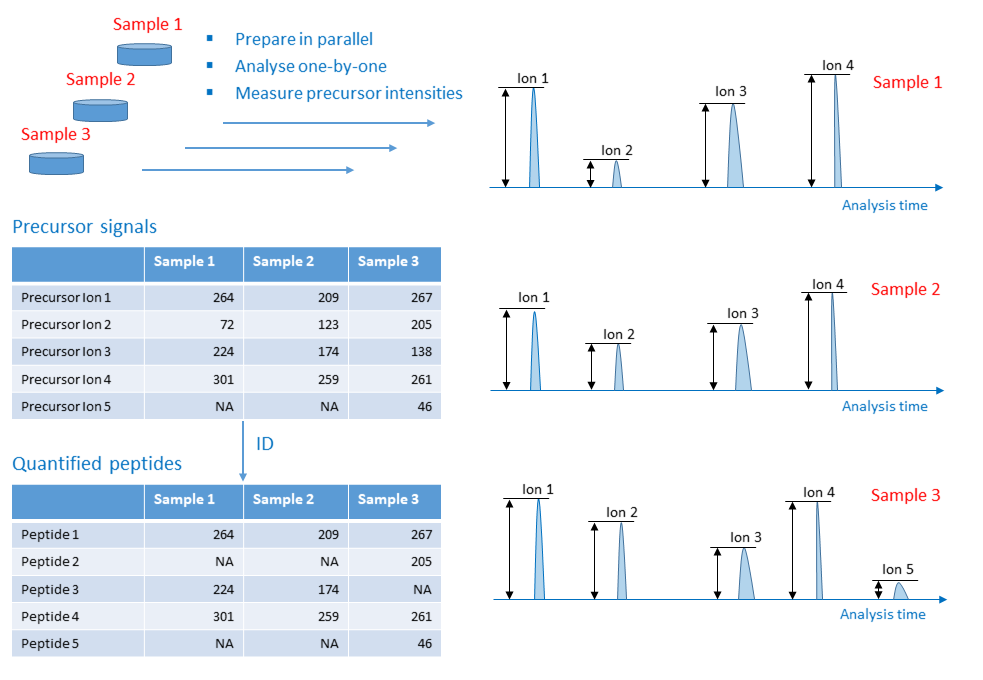
Label-free quantification experiment with 3 samples, 3 LC-MS files and 5 precursor ions/peptides. Intensities at the peak of the chromatographic peaks are used for quantification in this particular case. Peptides are identified via fragmentation mass spectra, and some of the precursor ions will be quantified, but not mapped to any peptide sequence.

Label-free quantification may be based on precursor signal intensity or on spectral counting. The first method is useful when applied to high precision mass spectra, such as those obtained using the new generation of time-of-flight (ToF), fourier transform ion cyclotron resonance (FTICR), or Orbitrap mass analyzers. The high-resolution power facilitates the extraction of peptide signals on the MS^{1} level and thus uncouples the quantification from the identification process. In contrast, spectral counting simply counts the number of spectra identified for a given peptide in different biological samples and then integrates the results for all measured peptides of the protein(s) that are quantified.

The computational framework of label free approach includes detecting peptides, matching the corresponding peptides across multiple LC-MS data, selecting discriminatory peptides.

Intact protein expression spectrometry (IPEx) is a label-free quantification approach in mass spectrometry under development by the analytical chemistry group at the United States Food and Drug Administration Center for Food Safety and Applied Nutrition and elsewhere. Intact proteins are analyzed by an LCMS instrument, usually a quadrupole time-of-flight in profile mode, and the full protein profile is determined and quantified using data reduction software. Early results are very encouraging. In one study, two groups of treatment replicates from mammalian samples (different organisms with similar treatment histories, but not technical replicates) show dozens of low CV protein biomarkers, suggesting that IPEx is a viable technology for studying protein expression.

== Detecting peptides ==
Typically, peptide signals are detected at the MS1 level and distinguished from chemical noise through their characteristic isotopic pattern. These patterns are then tracked across the retention time dimension and used to reconstruct a chromatographic elution profile of the mono-isotopic peptide mass. The total ion current of the peptide signal is then integrated and used as a quantitative measurement of the original peptide concentration. For each detected peptide, all isotopic peaks are first found and the charge state is then assigned.

Label-free quantification may be based on precursor signal intensity and has problems due to isolation interference: in high-throughput studies, the identity of the peptide precursor ion being measured could easily be a completely different peptide with a similar m/z ratio and which elutes in a time frame overlapping with that of the former peptide. Spectral counting has problems due to the fact that the peptides are identified, thus making it necessary to run an additional MS/MS scan which takes time and therefore reduces the resolution of the experiment.

== Matching corresponding peptides ==
In contrast to differential labelling, every biological specimen needs to be measured separately in a label-free experiment. The extracted peptide signals are then mapped across few or multiple LC-MS measurements using their coordinates on the mass-to-charge and retention-time dimensions. Data from high mass precision instruments greatly facilitate this process and increase the certainty of matching correct peptide signals across runs.

Clearly, differential processing of biological samples makes it necessary to have a standard which can be used to adjust the results. Peptides that are not expected to change in their expression levels in different biological samples may be used for this purpose. However, not all peptides ionize well and therefore the choice of candidates should be done after an initial study which should only characterize the protein content of the biological samples that will be investigated.

== Selecting discriminatory peptides ==
Finally, sophisticated normalization methods are used to remove systematic artefacts in the peptide intensity values between LC-MS measurements. Then, discriminatory peptides are identified by selecting the peptides whose normalized intensities are different (e.g., p-value < 0.05) among multiple groups of samples.

In addition, newer hybrid mass spectrometers like LTQ OrbiTrap offer the possibility to acquire MS/MS peptide identifications in parallel to the high mass precision measurement of peptides on the MS1 level. This raises the computational challenge for the processing and integration of these two sources of information and has led to the development of novel promising quantification strategies.
