= AnIML =

The Analytical Information Markup Language (AnIML) is an open ASTM XML standard for storing and sharing analytical chemistry and biological data.

== AnIML and FAIR data ==
A main reason of using AnIML is that FAIR data (Findable, Accessible, Interoperable and Reusable) standards are automatically implemented. As AnIML's structure is human-readable, Accessibility is given. Interoperability, Reusability and Findability are secured by the AnIML Core and AnIML Technique Definitions.

== History ==
AnIML has been continuously worked on starting from 2003 up to 2020. The last AnIML Core Version update happened in 2010. So far, no standardisation document nor public example files have been published. The standard exists only in pre-release form.

| Date | AnIML Core |
|---|---|
| 2010 | Version 0.9 |
| 2008 | Version 0.3 |
| 2006 | Version 0.2 |
| 2003 | Version 0.1 |

== Architecture ==
AnIML is a XML standard which consists of two logical layers:

- AnIML Core
- AnIML Technique Definitions

Additionally, AnIML Technique Definition Documents apply constraints to the AnIML Core and are specified by the AnIML Technique Definitions.

The AnIML Core consists of a set of rules defining the structure of the XML document, providing a universal container for arbitrary analytical data. AnIML Technique Definitions describe how to use the AnIML Core to record experiments of a particular scientific discipline. There is a big similarity between the mechanisms of AnIML and the AVI format. The AnIML Core defines the data container, whereas the AnIML Technique Definitions act similar to the AVI codec. It defines how the data needs to be structured and labeled. Technique Definitions are XML documents, specified by the Technique Schema.
