= Trans-Proteomic Pipeline =

Data analysis software for proteomics

TPP
- Developer(s): Institute for Systems Biology
- Initial release: 10 December 2004; 20 years ago
- Stable release: 5.0.0 / 11 October 2016; 8 years ago
- Written in: C++, Perl, Java
- Operating system: Linux, Windows, OS X
- Type: Bioinformatics / Mass spectrometry software
- License: GPL v. 2.0 and LGPL
- Website: TPP Wiki

The Trans-Proteomic Pipeline (TPP) is an open-source data analysis software for proteomics developed at the Institute for Systems Biology (ISB) by the Ruedi Aebersold group under the Seattle Proteome Center. The TPP includes PeptideProphet, ProteinProphet, ASAPRatio, XPRESS and Libra.

== Software Components ==
=== Probability Assignment and Validation ===
PeptideProphet performs statistical validation of peptide-spectra-matches (PSM) using the results of search engines by estimating a false discovery rate (FDR) on PSM level. The initial PeptideProphet used a fit of a Gaussian distribution for the correct identifications and a fit of a gamma distribution for the incorrect identification. A later modification of the program allowed the usage of a target-decoy approach, using either a variable component mixture model or a semi-parametric mixture model. In the PeptideProphet, specifying a decoy tag will use the variable component mixture model while selecting a non-parametric model will use the semi-parametric mixture model.

ProteinProphet identifies proteins based on the results of PeptideProphet.

Mayu performs statistical validation of protein identification by estimating a false discovery rate (FDR) on protein level.

=== Spectral library handling ===
The SpectraST tool is able to generate spectral libraries and search datasets using these libraries.

== See also ==
- OpenMS
- ProteoWizard
- Mass spectrometry software
