= Data-independent acquisition =

In mass spectrometry, data-independent acquisition (DIA) is a method of molecular structure determination in which all ions within a selected m/z range are fragmented and analyzed in a second stage of tandem mass spectrometry. Tandem mass spectra are acquired either by fragmenting all ions that enter the mass spectrometer at a given time (called broadband DIA) or by sequentially isolating and fragmenting ranges of m/z. DIA is an alternative to data-dependent acquisition (DDA) where a fixed number of precursor ions are selected and analyzed by tandem mass spectrometry.

== Broadband ==
One of the first DIA approaches was a nozzle-skimmer dissociation method called shotgun collision-induced dissociation (CID). Fragmentation can be in the ion source of the mass spectrometer by increasing the nozzle-skimmer voltage in electrospray ionization.

MS^{E} is a broadband DIA technique that uses alternating low-energy CID and high-energy CID. The low-energy CID is used to acquire precursor ion mass spectra whereas the high-energy CID is used to obtain product ion information by tandem mass spectrometry.

== Data analysis ==
Data analysis is generally challenging for DIA methods as the resulting fragment ion spectra are highly multiplexed. In DIA spectra therefore the direct relation between a precursor ion and its fragment ions is lost since the fragment ions in DIA spectra may potentially result from multiple precursor ions (any precursor ion present in the m/z range from which the DIA spectrum was derived).

One approach to DIA data analysis attempts to use database-based search engines used in data-dependent acquisition to search the produced multiplexed spectra. This approach can be improved by assigning individual fragment ion to precursor ions observed in precursor ion scans, using the elution profile of the fragment ions and the precursor ions, and then searching the resulting "pseudo-spectra".

A second approach to DIA data analysis is based on a targeted analysis, also known as SWATH-MS (Sequential Windowed Acquisition of All Theoretical Fragment Ion Mass Spectra). This approach uses targeted extraction of fragment ion traces directly for identification and quantification without an explicit attempt to de-multiplex the DIA fragment ion spectra.

== See also ==
- Fragmentation (mass spectrometry)
- Ion-mobility spectrometry–mass spectrometry
- Targeted mass spectrometry
