= List of mass spectrometry acronyms =

This is a compilation of initialisms and acronyms commonly used in mass spectrometry.

== A ==
- ADI – Ambient desorption ionization
- AE – Appearance energy
- AFADESI – Air flow-assisted desorption electrospray ionization
- AFAI – Air flow-assisted ionization
- AFAPA – Aerosol flowing atmospheric-pressure afterglow
- AGHIS – All-glass heated inlet system
- AIRLAB – Ambient infrared laser ablation
- AMS – Accelerator mass spectrometry
- AMS – Aerosol mass spectrometer
- AMU – Atomic mass unit
- AP – Appearance potential
- AP MALDI – Atmospheric pressure matrix-assisted laser desorption/ionization
- APCI – Atmospheric pressure chemical ionization
- API – Atmospheric pressure ionization
- APPI – Atmospheric pressure photoionization
- ASAP – Atmospheric Sample Analysis Probe
- ASMS – American Society for Mass Spectrometry

== B ==
- BP – Base peak
- BIRD – Blackbody infrared radiative dissociation

== C ==
- CRF – Charge remote fragmentation
- CSR – Charge stripping reaction
- CI – Chemical ionization
- CA – Collisional activation
- CAD – Collisionally activated dissociation
- CID – Collision-induced dissociation
- CRM – Consecutive reaction monitoring
- CF-FAB – Continuous flow fast atom bombardment
- CRIMS – Chemical reaction interface mass spectrometry
- CTD – Charge transfer dissociation

== D ==
- DE – Delayed extraction
- DADI – Direct analysis of daughter ions
- DAPPI – Desorption atmospheric pressure photoionization
- DEP – Direct exposure probe
- DESI – Desorption electrospray ionization
- DIOS – Desorption/ionization on silicon
- DIP – Direct insertion probe
- DART – Direct analysis in real time
- DLI – Direct liquid introduction
- DIA – Data independent acquisition

== E ==
- EA – Electron affinity
- EAD – Electron-activated dissociation
- ECD – Electron-capture dissociation
- ECI – Electron capture ionization
- EDD – Electron-detachment dissociation
- EI – Electron ionization (or electron impact)
- EJMS – European Journal of Mass Spectrometry
- ESA – Electrostatic energy analyzer
- ES/ESI – Electrospray ionisation
- ETD – Electron-transfer dissociation
- eV – Electronvolt

== F ==
- FAIMS – High-field asymmetric waveform ion mobility spectrometry
- FAB – Fast atom bombardment
- FIB – Fast ion bombardment
- FD – Field desorption
- FFR – Field-free region
- FI – Field ionization
- FT-ICR MS – Fourier transform ion cyclotron resonance mass spectrometer
- FTMS – Fourier transform mass spectrometer

== G ==
- GDMS – Glow discharge mass spectrometry

== H ==
- HDX – Hydrogen/deuterium exchange
- HCD – Higher-energy C-trap dissociation

== I ==
- ICAT – Isotope-coded affinity tag
- ICP – Inductively coupled plasma
- ICRMS – Ion cyclotron resonance mass spectrometer
- IDMS – Isotope dilution mass spectrometry
- IJMS – International Journal of Mass Spectrometry
- IRMPD – Infrared multiphoton dissociation
- IKES – Ion kinetic energy spectrometry
- IMS – Ion mobility spectrometry
- IMSC – International Mass Spectrometry Conference
- IMSF – International Mass Spectrometry Foundation
- IRMS – Isotope ratio mass spectrometry
- IT – Ion trap
- ITMS – Ion trap mass spectrometry
- ITMS – Ion trap mobility spectrometry
- iTRAQ – Isobaric tag for relative and absolute quantitation

== J ==
- JASMS – Journal of the American Society for Mass Spectrometry
- JEOL – Japan Electro-Optics Laboratory
- JMS – Journal of Mass Spectrometry

== K ==
- KER – Kinetic energy release
- KERD – Kinetic energy release distribution

== L ==
- LCMS – Liquid chromatography–mass spectrometry
- LD – Laser desorption
- LDI – Laser desorption ionization
- LI – Laser ionization
- LMMS – Laser microprobe mass spectrometry
- LIT – Linear ion trap
- LSI – Liquid secondary ionization
- LSII – Laserspray ionization inlet

== M ==
- MIKES – Mass-analyzed ion kinetic energy spectrometry
- MS – Mass spectrometer
- MS – Mass spectrometry
- MS^{2} – Mass spectrometry/mass spectrometry, i.e. tandem mass spectrometry
- MS/MS – Mass spectrometry/mass spectrometry, i.e. tandem mass spectrometry
- MALDESI – Matrix-assisted laser desorption electrospray ionization
- MALDI – Matrix-assisted laser desorption/ionization
- MAII – Matrix-assisted inlet ionization
- MAIV – Matrix-assisted ionization vacuum
- MIMS – Membrane introduction mass spectrometry, membrane inlet mass spectrometry, membrane interface mass spectrometry
- MCP – Microchannel plate
- MS^{n} – Multiple-stage mass spectrometry
- MCP – Microchannel plate
- MPI – Multiphoton ionization
- MRM – Multiple reaction monitoring

== N ==
- NEMS-MS – Nanoelectromechanical systems mass spectrometry
- NETD – Negative electron-transfer dissociation
- NICI – Negative ion chemical ionization
- NRMS – Neutralization reionization mass spectrometry

== O ==
- oa-TOF – Orthogonal acceleration time of flight
- OMS – Organic Mass Spectrometry (journal)

== P ==
- PDI – Plasma desorption/ionization
- PDMS – Plasma desorption mass spectrometry
- PAD – Post-acceleration detector
- PSD – Post-source decay
- PyMS – Pyrolysis mass spectrometry

== Q ==
- QUISTOR – Quadrupole ion storage trap
- QIT – Quadrupole ion trap
- QMS – Quadrupole mass spectrometer
- QTOF – Quadrupole time of flight

== R ==
- RCM – Rapid Communications in Mass Spectrometry
- REIMS – Rapid evaporative ionization mass spectrometry
- REMPI – Resonance enhanced multiphoton ionization
- RGA – Residual gas analyzer
- RI – Resonance ionization

== S ==
- SAII – Solvent-assisted ionization inlet
- SELDI – Surface-enhanced laser desorption/ionization
- SESI – Secondary electrospray ionization
- SHRIMP – Sensitive high-resolution ion microprobe
- SIFT – Selected ion flow tube
- SILAC – Stable isotope labelling by amino acids in cell culture
- SIM – Selected ion monitoring
- SIMS – Secondary ion mass spectrometry
- SIR – Selected ion recording
- SNMS – Secondary neutral mass spectrometry
- SRM – Selected reaction monitoring
- SWIFT – Stored waveform inverse Fourier transform
- SID – Surface-induced dissociation
- SIR – Surface-induced reaction
- SI – Surface ionization
- SORI – Sustained off-resonance irradiation

== T ==
- TI – Thermal ionization
- TIC - Total ion chromatogram
- TICC – Total ion current chromatogram, synonymous with TIC
- TLF – Time-lag focusing
- TMT – Tandem mass tags
- TOF-MS – Time-of-flight mass spectrometer
