= Dundee Cell Products =

Dundee Cell Products Ltd
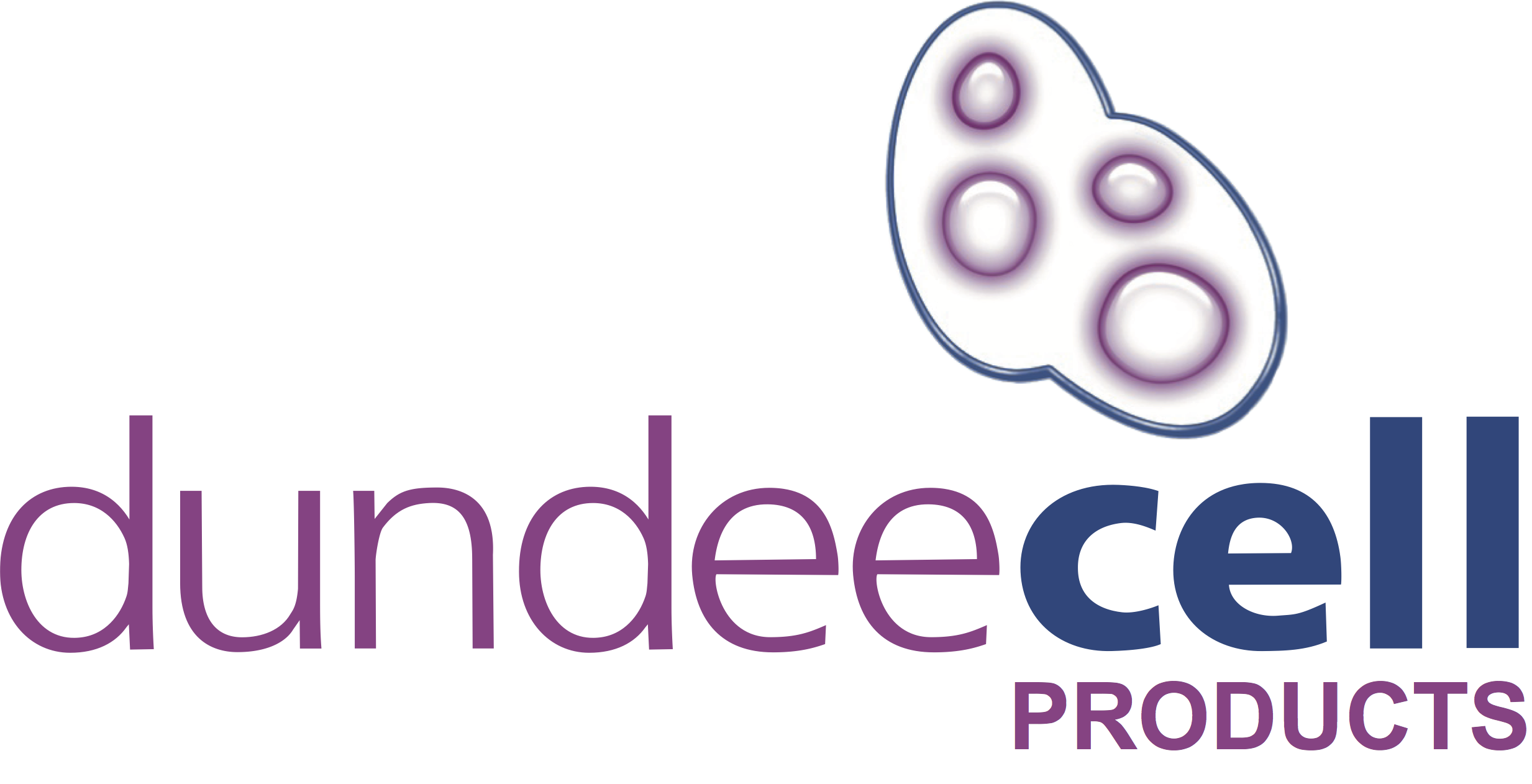
- Company type: Private company
- Industry: Biotechnology
- Founded: 2006
- Headquarters: Dundee, Scotland, UK
- Products: Biochemical reagents, procedure kits, specialized research products
- Services: Proteomics, DNA cloning, gene synthesis, antibody development, protein expression and purification
- Website: www.dundeecellproducts.com

Dundee Cell Products (DCP) is a biotechnology company headquartered in Dundee, Scotland, United Kingdom.

The company is a bioreagents and life sciences services company which commercialises research tools for biochemistry, molecular biology and cell biology research, and provides services in these areas to the life sciences community. The company’s key business activities include research and development of new innovative products and services, commercialization of products in-licensed from academic institutions, distribution of life sciences research products from commercial partners and supply of contract research services to both academic and pharmaceutical/biotechnology companies customers.

== History ==
Dundee Cell Products Ltd was founded in 2006 as a spinout of the internationally renowned School of Life Sciences of the University of Dundee by Dr Paul Ajuh (now with Gemini Biosciences ) and Prof. Angus Lamond (Lamond Lab). Since spinout the company has maintained close interactions with researchers at the institution and a strong relationship with the University.

In 2007, the company secured equity investment funding from a syndicate of angel investors to finance and expand its activities with follow up investment secured in 2009 from angel investors and the Scottish Co-investment Fund (SCF). The investment was secured to support the business’s growth plans. Over the last four years DCP has enjoyed significant growth in its products portfolio and turnover.

== Research and innovation ==
In the past three years, the company has developed and commercialized several new products e.g. SILAC ready to use media and has been involved in proteomics research collaborations with scientists in both academic institutions and pharmaceutical companies. Some of these projects have been designed to investigate the effects of virus infections on cellular proteomes in order to elucidate the mechanisms and cellular pathways involved in virus–host factor interactions. DCP has also collaborated in a phosphoproteomics project designed to study the molecular mechanisms in the pathogenesis of transmissible spongiform encephalopathies (TSEs) or prion disease. Transmissible spongiform encephalopathies are fatal diseases associated with the conversion of the cellular prion protein to an abnormal prion protein leading to damage of brain and neural tissue. Examples of prion diseases include bovine spongiform encephalopathy (BSE, also known as "mad cow disease") in cattle and Creutzfeldt–Jakob disease (CJD) in humans. There is currently no treatment for prion diseases, which are usually fatal to the host.

Current R&D projects within the company have been focused on developing applications for SILAC quantitative proteomics in predictive toxicology. These projects are designed to provide data that will be used in developing predictive models for drug toxicity early on during the drug discovery and development process.

== Portfolio ==
DCP initially developed antibodies, mammalian cell fractions for precursor mRNA splicing research and tissue culture media specifically formulated for SILAC quantitative proteomics. The first products commercialized by the company came from the research interests of the founding scientists who saw an opportunity in the market for developing and commercializing high quality research products and services in the research area to other colleagues. The company has subsequently expanded its products and services portfolio into many other areas of life sciences research to better cover the needs of its customers.

=== Product lines ===
Dundee Cell Products commercializes a broad range of life sciences research products (many of which have been developed in-house) including cell culture media for quantitative proteomics, mammalian cell fractions e.g. nuclei, nucleoli, mitochondria and cell fractions for quantitative proteomics, antibodies, recombinant proteins, fluorescent cell markers and primary mammalian cells. The company’s SILAC ready to use media have been specially formulated to facilitate the use of SILAC technology by non-specialists in proteomics and scientists who are interested in the application of unbiased high throughput quantitative proteomics approaches in their R&D activities.

=== Research services ===
As well as offering research products, the company’s portfolio has grown to include research services designed to accelerate the research activities of scientists in both the academic and biotech/pharmaceutical industry sectors. Some of the research services that DCP offers include gene synthesis, DNA cloning, recombinant protein expression and purification, stable cell line development, custom monoclonal and polyclonal antibody development and various proteomics services i.e. both quantitative (e.g. SILAQ, Tandem Mass Tags, iTRAQ, Isotope-coded affinity tag (ICAT), label-free) and qualitative.

In collaboration with scientists at the University of Dundee, the company is developing novel and innovative products and services in the areas of proteomics, molecular biology and cell biology focused on the needs of research scientists in academic institutions as well as those in biotechnology and pharmaceutical companies.

== Corporate information ==
- Mr John Ivinson - Chief Executive Officer
- Professor Angus Lamond - Scientific Advisor
