= Selenium responsive proteins =

Selenium responsive proteins within human biology, are the class of proteins sensitive to selenium, in healthy human beings, in cancer patients, in in-vivo models or in-vitro cell culture models.

The original gi accession (version) numbers have been updated to NCBI accession number and protein names updated accordingly.

Accession number	Common abbreviation	Protein name	Responsive in	Selenium compound	technique used	source
Q08091	CNN1	Calponin-1	TRAMP (prostate cancer mouse model)	MSeC	iTRAQ LC-MS/MS	Zhang 2010
NP_035656	TAGLN	Transgelin	TRAMP (prostate cancer mouse model)	MSeC	iTRAQ LC-MS/MS	Zhang 2010
NP_033822	APOA1	Apolipoprotein A-I	TRAMP (prostate cancer mouse model)	MSeC, MseA	iTRAQ LC-MS/MS	Zhang 2010
NP_038499	ANXA4	Annexin A4	TRAMP (prostate cancer mouse model)	MseA	iTRAQ LC-MS/MS	Zhang 2010
gi21071030	A1BG	Alpha 1B-glycoprotein	Healthy Human blood serum	Selenium enriched yeast	2D DIGE LC-MS/MS	Sinha 2010
gi4557871	TF	Transferrin	Healthy Human blood serum	Selenium enriched yeast	2D DIGE LC-MS/MS	Sinha 2010
gi4502501	C4b	Complement component 4B proprotein	Healthy Human blood serum	Selenium enriched yeast	2D DIGE LC-MS/MS	Sinha 2010
NP_059086	SEMG1	semenogelin I	TRAMP DLP UP	MSeA, MSeC	iTRAQ LC-MS/MS	Zhang 2010
CAA47699	BGPG	Biliary glycoprotein	TRAMP DLP UP	MSeA, MSeC	iTRAQ LC-MS/MS	Zhang 2010
NP_780375	BASP1	brain acid soluble protein 1	TRAMP DLP UP	MSeA	iTRAQ LC-MS/MS	Zhang 2010
NP_031789		Cysteine-rich protein 1	TRAMP DLP UP	MSeA	iTRAQ LC-MS/MS	Zhang 2010
NP_059067	HPX	Hemopexin	TRAMP DLP UP	MSeA	iTRAQ LC-MS/MS	Zhang 2010
gi7305531		Seminal vesicle secretion 6	TRAMP DLP UP	MSeA	iTRAQ LC-MS/MS	Zhang 2010
NP_780375	DMBTL_MOUSE	putative DMBT1-like protein precursor	TRAMP DLP UP	MSeC	iTRAQ LC-MS/MS	Zhang 2010
gi6755212		Proteasome (prosome, macropain) 28 subunit, α	TRAMP DLP UP	MSeC	iTRAQ LC-MS/MS	Zhang 2010
NP_035309	PSAP	Prosaposin	TRAMP DLP UP	MSeC	iTRAQ LC-MS/MS	Zhang 2010
gi123794006		FUSE-binding protein 2	TRAMP DLP UP	MSeC	iTRAQ LC-MS/MS	Zhang 2010
gi84875537		Nucleolin	TRAMP DLP UP	MSeC	iTRAQ LC-MS/MS	Zhang 2010
gi40254525		Tropomyosin 3, gamma	TRAMP DLP UP	MSeC	iTRAQ LC-MS/MS	Zhang 2010
NP_032775	NUCB1	Nucleobindin 1	TRAMP DLP DOWN	MSeC	iTRAQ LC-MS/MS	Zhang 2010
gi94717635		Progesterone receptor membrane component	TRAMP DLP DOWN	MSeC	iTRAQ LC-MS/MS	Zhang 2010
gi21704156		Caldesmon 1	TRAMP DLP DOWN	MSeC	iTRAQ LC-MS/MS	Zhang 2010
gi31980648		ATP synthase, H+ transporting mitochondrial F1 complex β	TRAMP DLP DOWN	MSeC	iTRAQ LC-MS/MS	Zhang 2010
gi10946574		Creatine kinase, brain	TRAMP DLP DOWN	MSeC	iTRAQ LC-MS/MS	Zhang 2010
gi94367355		Similar to 60S ribosomal protein L5	TRAMP DLP DOWN	MSeC	iTRAQ LC-MS/MS	Zhang 2010
gi31981520		Pancreatic ribonuclease	TRAMP DLP DOWN	MSeC	iTRAQ LC-MS/MS	Zhang 2010
gi6754084		Glutathione S-transferase, mu 1	TRAMP DLP DOWN	MSeC	iTRAQ LC-MS/MS	Zhang 2010
gi6680121		Glutathione S-transferase, μ 2	TRAMP DLP DOWN	MSeC	iTRAQ LC-MS/MS	Zhang 2010
gi31981302		Annexin A6	TRAMP DLP DOWN	MSeC	iTRAQ LC-MS/MS	Zhang 2010
gi6678740		Lumican	TRAMP DLP DOWN	MSeC	iTRAQ LC-MS/MS	Zhang 2010
gi94403723		Similar to Heat shock 70-kDa protein 1B (HSP70.1)	TRAMP DLP DOWN	MSeC	iTRAQ LC-MS/MS	Zhang 2010
gi89574165		Succinate dehydrogenase complex subunit A	TRAMP DLP DOWN	MSeA	iTRAQ LC-MS/MS	Zhang 2010
gi70778915		Moesin	TRAMP DLP DOWN	MSeA	iTRAQ LC-MS/MS	Zhang 2010
gi6679567		Polymerase I and transcript release factor	TRAMP DLP DOWN	MSeA	iTRAQ LC-MS/MS	Zhang 2010
gi31791059		Activated leukocyte cell adhesion molecule	TRAMP DLP DOWN	MSeA	iTRAQ LC-MS/MS	Zhang 2010
gi76779293		Keratin 8	TRAMP DLP DOWN	MSeA	iTRAQ LC-MS/MS	Zhang 2010
gi6671549		Peroxiredoxin 6	TRAMP DLP DOWN	MSeA	iTRAQ LC-MS/MS	Zhang 2010
gi6680836		Calreticulin	TRAMP DLP DOWN	MSeA	iTRAQ LC-MS/MS	Zhang 2010
NP_808579	TGM4	protein-glutamine gamma-glutamyltransferase 4	TRAMP DLP DOWN	MSeA	iTRAQ LC-MS/MS	Zhang 2010
gi8567372		Probasin	TRAMP DLP DOWN	MSeA	iTRAQ LC-MS/MS	Zhang 2010
gi2506545		78-kDa glucose-regulated protein precursor (GRP 78)	TRAMP DLP DOWN	MSeA	iTRAQ LC-MS/MS	Zhang 2010
gi7643979		170-kDa glucose regulated protein GRP170	TRAMP DLP DOWN	MSeA	iTRAQ LC-MS/MS	Zhang 2010
gi31542563		DnaJ (Hsp40) homolog, subfamily C, member 3	TRAMP DLP DOWN	MSeA	iTRAQ LC-MS/MS	Zhang 2010
gi71774133		Peptidylprolyl isomerase B (PPI)	TRAMP DLP DOWN	MSeA	iTRAQ LC-MS/MS	Zhang 2010
gi130232		Protein disulfide isomerase b family, ERp57 subfamily	TRAMP DLP DOWN	MSeA	iTRAQ LC-MS/MS	Zhang 2010
gi129729		Protein disulfide isomerase ERp59	TRAMP DLP DOWN	MSeA	iTRAQ LC-MS/MS	Zhang 2010
gi86198316		Protein disulfide isomerase associated 4	TRAMP DLP DOWN	MSeA	iTRAQ LC-MS/MS	Zhang 2010
gi58037267		Protein disulfide isomerase-associated 6	TRAMP DLP DOWN	MSeA, MSeC	iTRAQ LC-MS/MS	Zhang 2010
gi6753010		Anterior gradient 2	TRAMP DLP DOWN	MSeA, MSeC	iTRAQ LC-MS/MS	Zhang 2010
gi42794267		Experimental autoimmune prostatitis antigen 2	TRAMP DLP DOWN	MSeA, MSeC	iTRAQ LC-MS/MS	Zhang 2010
gi31543942		Vinculin	TRAMP DLP DOWN	MSeA, MSeC	iTRAQ LC-MS/MS	Zhang 2010
gi94387119		PREDICTED: similar to heat shock protein 8	TRAMP DLP DOWN	MSeA, MSeC	iTRAQ LC-MS/MS	Zhang 2010
gi6752952		Actin, γ2, smooth muscle, enteric	TRAMP DLP DOWN	MSeA, MSeC	iTRAQ LC-MS/MS	Zhang 2010
gi94381948		PREDICTED: similar to Fc fragment of IgG binding protein	TRAMP DLP DOWN	MSeA, MSeC	iTRAQ LC-MS/MS	Zhang 2010
gi6754482		Keratin complex 1, acidic, gene 18	TRAMP DLP DOWN	MSeA, MSeC	iTRAQ LC-MS/MS	Zhang 2010
gi5031777		isocitrate dehydrogenase	Healthy Human blood serum	Selenium enriched yeast	2D DIGE LC-MS/MS	Sinha 2010
NP_005134	HP	Haptoglobin isoform 1 preproprotein	Healthy Human blood serum	Selenium enriched yeast	2D DIGE LC-MS/MS	Sinha 2010
gi42716297	CLU	Clusterin isoform 1	Healthy Human blood serum	Selenium enriched yeast	2D DIGE LC-MS/MS	Sinha 2010
gi17318569		Keratin 1	Healthy Human blood serum	Selenium enriched yeast	2D DIGE LC-MS/MS	Sinha 2010
gi4507725		Transthyretin	Healthy Human blood serum	Selenium enriched yeast	2D DIGE LC-MS/MS	Sinha 2010
gi21361198	AAT	Alpha-1 antitrypsin	Healthy Human blood serum	Selenium enriched yeast	2D DIGE LC-MS/MS	Sinha 2010
gi4557287		Angiotensin precursor	Healthy Human blood serum	Selenium enriched yeast	2D DIGE LC-MS/MS	Sinha 2010
gi4502027		Albumin precursor	Healthy Human blood serum	Selenium enriched yeast	2D DIGE LC-MS/MS	Sinha 2010
