= Stem cell proteomics =

Stem cells

Stem cell proteomics is a developing field of omics that analyzes the proteomes of stem cells. The main interest of the application of proteomics on stem cells is the identification and quantification of varying proteomes that determine stem cell differentiation. The two central components to the understanding of stem cell differentiation are cell fate and cell state. Cell fate is the likelihood a cell will differentiate into a particular type of cell. Cell state is the profiling of a type of cell using a combination of unique markers that differentiate one lineage from another. Some notable markers of cell states analyzed with proteomics include surface proteins, translation rate, and post transcriptional modifications.

== Stem Cells ==
Stem cells are undifferentiated cells that are capable of self-replicating. The main types of stem cells are embryonic, adult, and induced pluripotent. Embryonic and induced pluripotent are most frequently studied using proteomics, since both types have more expansive capabilities in which it can be differentiated than adult stem cells. This is defined by the ability to create cells of all three germ layers: ectoderm, endoderm, and mesoderm. This unique undifferentiated state is also referred to as cellular plasticity as stem cells have the potential to differentiate into different types of cells. Stem cell plasticity is regulated by various factors including signaling cascades, transcription, translation, and epigenetics. These regulators can also be analyzed through proteomics to understand cell fate determination.

== Techniques ==
Mass spectrometry is the most popular technique used for analyzing stem cells. Mass spectrometry determines the mass of protein products that can then be used to infer their identity, however is not distinctive enough to be the sole marker. This led to the development of subsequent techniques based on mass spectrometry in tandem with another technique.

The main techniques for identification of proteins are: Tandem mass-spectrometry (MSMS), Liquid chromatography (LC-MSMS), Shotgun proteomics, Targeted proteomics, and phospho-proteomics. The main techniques for quantification of proteins includes: Stable isotope labeling with amino acids in cell culture (SILAC), Di-methyl labeling, Isobaric tag for relative and absolute quantification (iTRAQ), Tandem mass tag (TMT), and Label-free quantification. Specific application of proteomic technology to stem cell biology include: membrane proteomics for cell surface markers, phosphoproteomics for signal transduction, shotgun proteomics for differential protein expression, interaction proteomics with protein complexes and protein-RNA interactions, protein interactions in chromatin with transcriptional regulation, and histone post transcriptional modification analysis with epigenetics.

The primary study of proteomics has been in vitro as there have been continually progress within in vitro cell culture systems that mimic developmental processes that are not easily accessible in vivo.

== History ==
Marc Wilkins in 1994 was the first to describe the word "proteosome." The overall goal of stem proteomics is to determine the factors needed for cellular reprogramming by first looking at what factors determine cell-fate. The first strategy used to identify samples of cells and tissues was based on electrophoresis. Electrophoresis-based proteomics was too time consuming due to the complexity of proteins and was also limited by the number of samples to be tested at a time. These limitations were solved by advances in mass spectrometry and liquid chromatography. Mass spectrometry and Liquid chromatography are the foundational basis of the majority of techniques used for proteomics. The analysis of stem cells using proteomics started with embryonic stem cells. Current proteomic analysis of stem cells primarily focuses on induced pluripotent stem cells (iPSC). This is due to the ethical concerns regarding the use of embryonic stem cells.

== Future Applications and Limitations ==
Role of stem cell proteomics within in ethical dilemma of Stem Cell research

The usage of embryonic stem cells (ESCs) has been a growing concern within the scientific community, as it damages the embryo and prevents the potential development of a human being. In more recent years, there's been a development of human induced pluripotent stem cells (iPSCs) which are somatic cells that have been reprogrammed back to the pluripotent state. The introduction of iPSCs gets rid of the ethical issue within traditional stem cell research, but their potential is dependent on their similarities to that of embryonic stem cells. Stem cell proteomics has been used to characterize the both ESC and iPSCs to compare and contrast the two to see if iPSCs can be a reasonable alternative to ESC. iPSCs and ESCs are almost identical on a proteasome level.

Future Applications

The discoveries through stem cell proteomics impact expands both clinically and scientifically. Stem cells are closely related to cancerous cells due to their ability to self-replicate. Thus, the study of stem cell fates and replication behavior has clinical implications in drug targeted therapy for cancer. A field of medicine heavily tied to stem cell research is regenerative medicine. Regenerative medicine is a field of medicine that focuses on repair and restoration of function in tissues and cells. The continued usage of proteomics on induced pluripotent cells in particular has the potential to be used in applications of disease modeling, drug discovery, and toxicity screenings. The main two types of models used within regenerative medicine are 2-D and organoids and proteomics in iPSC derived organizing allow for the recreating of models that resemble real systems. iPSC have become a main candidate of study due to their ability to differentiate into many cell types and also maintain patient genetic information. The ability to maintain patient genetic information opens up the possibilities of genetic disease modeling and personalized medicine. Within the development of stem cell proteomics, there is the potential of advances for the integration of epigenetic status of cells to have the ability to both self-replicate and be differentiated and the scaling up of cell expansion and differentiation. Stem cell proteomics overall also provides greater knowledge into development.

Limitations

The entire proteomic analysis of stem cells will continue to be a challenge due to the numerous types of proteins formed by post transcriptional modifications and proteomic techniques are not currently capable of detecting which proteins are biologically relevant. Human proteasomes also require a larger amount of cellular input, access is limited, protein concentrations vary.
