= Maeve (disambiguation) =

Maeve is a feminine given name.

Maeve, Maev or Maiv may also refer to:

- Maeve (film), a 1981 drama film
- LÉ Maev, an Irish Naval Service corvette
- Stella Maeve (born 1989), American actress
- Queen Maeve International Summer School, an Irish traditional music summer school
- The Maeve, in Raleigh, North Carolina
- Matrix-assisted ionization vacuum (MAIV) - see List of mass spectrometry acronyms
