= Mudpit =

Mudpit may refer to:

- MudPIT, multi-dimensional protein identification technology
- Mudpit (TV series)
