= Beckey =

Beckey is a surname. Notable people with the surname include:

- Fred Beckey (1923–2017), American rock climber, mountaineer and author
- Hans-Dieter Beckey (1921–1992), German physicist
