= Stem cell genomics =

Analyzing the genes of stem cells

In biology and medicine, stem cell genomics is the analysis of the genomes of stem cells. Currently, this field is rapidly expanding due to the dramatic decrease in the cost of sequencing genomes. The study of stem cell genomics has wide reaching implications in the study of stem cell biology and possible therapeutic usages of stem cells.

== Applications ==
Application of research in this field could lead to drug discovery and information on diseases by the molecular characterization of the pluripotent stem cell through DNA and transcriptome sequencing and looking at the epigenetic changes of stem cells and subsequent products.

=== Single cell phenotypic analysis ===
One step in that process is single cell phenotypic analysis, and the connection between the phenotype and genotype of specific stem cells. While current genomic screens are done with entire populations of cells, focusing in on a single stem cell will help determine specific signaling activity associated with varying degrees of stem cell differentiation and limit background due to heterogeneous populations.

=== Alzheimer's disease ===
Single cell analysis of induced pluripotent stem cells (iPSCs), or stem cells able to differentiate into many different cell types, is a suggested method for treating such diseases like Alzheimer's disease (AD). This includes for understanding the differences between sporadic AD and familial AD. By first taking a skin sample from the patient and are transformed by transducing cells using retroviruses to encode such stem cell genes as Oct4, Sox2, KLF4 and cMYC. This allows for skin cells to be reprogrammed into patient-specific stem cell lines. Taking genomic sequences of these individual cells would allow for patient-specific treatments and furthering understanding of AD disease models.

=== Other diseases ===
This technique would be used for similar diseases, like amyotrophic lateral sclerosis (ALS) and spinal muscular atrophy (SMA). These stem cells developed from a singular patient would also be able to be used to produce cells affected in the above-mentioned diseases. As mentioned, it will also lead to patient specific phenotypes of each disease. Further chemical analyses to develop safer drugs can be done through sequence information and cell-culture tests on iPSCs. After development on a specific drug, it can be transferred to other patient diseased cells while also being safety tested.

== Methods ==
Included in the study of stem cell genomics, is epigenomics, genomic-scale studies on chromatin regulatory variation. These studies also hope to expand research into regenerative medicine models and stem cell differentiation. Cell-type specific gene expression patterns during development occur as the result of interactions the chromatin level.

Stem cell epigenomics focuses in on the epigenetic plasticity of human embryonic stem cells (hESCs).

=== Bivalent domains ===
This includes investigation into bivalent domains as promoters or chromatin regions that are modified by transcriptional initiation and related to gene silencing.

=== Active enhancers ===
They are also looking at the differences between active versus poised enhancers or enhancers that specifically control signaling-dependent gene regulation. Active enhancers are marked by acetylation of histone H3-H3K27ac and while poised are instead methylated at H3K27me3.

=== Methylation ===
Stem cell epigenomic studies are also looking into DNA methylation patterns, specifically characteristics of hydroxy methylation versus overall methylation and the difference between methylation of CpG-island rich and CpG poor promoters. It has been found in mouse embryonic stem cells (mESC) that implanted mESC took up similar characteristics of histone methylation of the embryos where they transplanted into, indicating that methylation may be indicative of environment. This will guide studies into the differences between induced pluripotent and embryonic stem cells. These studies hope to produce information on iPSC differentiation capacity by first needing to enhance chromatin signature reading.

=== Regulatory factors ===
It also hopes to produce to look into regulatory factors that control human embryonic development. Using drug therapy techniques as mentioned earlier, epigenomics would also allow for more information on drug activity.

== See also ==
- Stem cell proteomics
