= Protein mass spectrometry =

Application of mass spectrometry

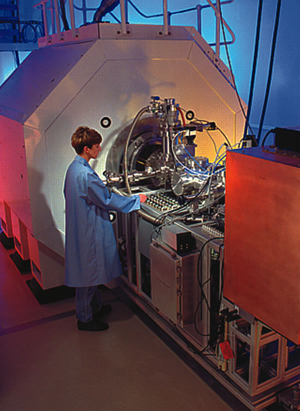
A mass spectrometer used for high throughput protein analysis.

Protein mass spectrometry refers to the application of mass spectrometry to the study of proteins. Mass spectrometry is an important method for the accurate mass determination and characterization of proteins, and a variety of methods and instrumentations have been developed for its many uses. Its applications include the identification of proteins and their post-translational modifications, the elucidation of protein complexes, their subunits and functional interactions, as well as the global measurement of proteins in proteomics. It can also be used to localize proteins to the various organelles, and determine the interactions between different proteins as well as with membrane lipids.

The two primary methods used for the ionization of protein in mass spectrometry are electrospray ionization (ESI) and matrix-assisted laser desorption/ionization (MALDI). These ionization techniques are used in conjunction with mass analyzers such as tandem mass spectrometry. In general, the proteins are analyzed either in a "top-down" approach in which proteins are analyzed intact, or a "bottom-up" approach in which protein are first digested into fragments. An intermediate "middle-down" approach in which larger peptide fragments are analyzed may also sometimes be used.

== History ==
The application of mass spectrometry to study proteins became popularized in the 1980s after the development of MALDI and ESI. These ionization techniques have played a significant role in the characterization of proteins. (MALDI) Matrix-assisted laser desorption ionization was coined in the late 1980s by Franz Hillenkamp and Michael Karas. Hillenkamp, Karas and their fellow researchers were able to ionize the amino acid alanine by mixing it with the amino acid tryptophan and irradiated with a pulse 266 nm laser. Though important, the breakthrough did not come until 1987. In 1987, Koichi Tanaka used the "ultra fine metal plus liquid matrix method" and ionized biomolecules the size of 34,472 Da protein carboxypeptidase-A.

In 1968, Malcolm Dole reported the first use of electrospray ionization with mass spectrometry. Around the same time MALDI became popularized, John Bennett Fenn was cited for the development of electrospray ionization. Koichi Tanaka received the 2002 Nobel Prize in Chemistry alongside John Fenn, and Kurt Wüthrich "for the development of methods for identification and structure analyses of biological macromolecules." These ionization methods have greatly facilitated the study of proteins by mass spectrometry. Consequently, protein mass spectrometry now plays a leading role in protein characterization.

== Methods and approaches ==
=== Techniques ===
Mass spectrometry of proteins requires that the proteins in solution or solid state be turned into an ionized form in the gas phase before they are injected and accelerated in an electric or magnetic field for analysis. The two primary methods for ionization of proteins are electrospray ionization (ESI) and matrix-assisted laser desorption/ionization (MALDI). In electrospray, the ions are created from proteins in solution, and it allows fragile molecules to be ionized intact, sometimes preserving non-covalent interactions. In MALDI, the proteins are embedded within a matrix normally in a solid form, and ions are created by pulses of laser light. Electrospray produces more multiply-charged ions than MALDI, allowing for measurement of high mass protein and better fragmentation for identification, while MALDI is fast and less likely to be affected by contaminants, buffers and additives.

Whole-protein mass analysis is primarily conducted using either time-of-flight (TOF) MS, or Fourier transform ion cyclotron resonance (FT-ICR). These two types of instrument are preferable here because of their wide mass range, and in the case of FT-ICR, its high mass accuracy. Electrospray ionization of a protein often results in generation of multiple charged species of 800 < m/z < 2000 and the resultant spectrum can be deconvoluted to determine the protein's average mass to within 50 ppm or better using TOF or ion-trap instruments.

Mass analysis of proteolytic peptides is a popular method of protein characterization, as cheaper instrument designs can be used for characterization. Additionally, sample preparation is easier once whole proteins have been digested into smaller peptide fragments. The most widely used instrument for peptide mass analysis are the MALDI-TOF instruments as they permit the acquisition of peptide mass fingerprints (PMFs) at high pace (1 PMF can be analyzed in approx. 10 sec). Multiple stage quadrupole-time-of-flight and the quadrupole ion trap also find use in this application.

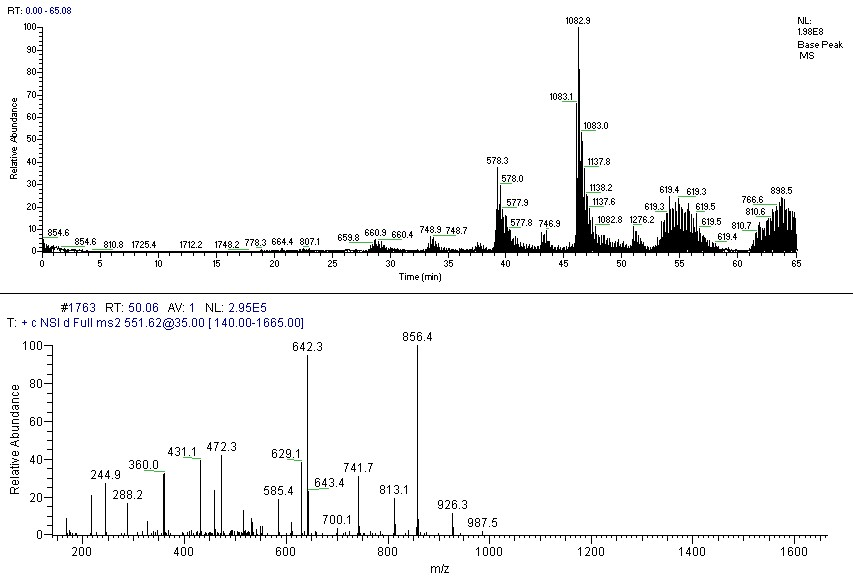
Chromatography trace and MS/MS spectra of a peptide.

Tandem mass spectrometry (MS/MS) is used to measure fragmentation spectra and identify proteins at high speed and accuracy. Collision-induced dissociation is used in mainstream applications to generate a set of fragments from a specific peptide ion. The fragmentation process primarily gives rise to cleavage products that break along peptide bonds. Because of this simplicity in fragmentation, it is possible to use the observed fragment masses to match with a database of predicted masses for one of many given peptide sequences. Tandem MS of whole protein ions has been investigated recently using electron capture dissociation and has demonstrated extensive sequence information in principle but is not in common practice.

=== Approaches ===
In keeping with the performance and mass range of available mass spectrometers, two approaches are used for characterizing proteins.

In the first, intact proteins are ionized by either of the two techniques described above, and then introduced to a mass analyzer. This approach is referred to as "top-down" strategy of protein analysis as it involves starting with the whole mass and then pulling it apart. The top-down approach however is mostly limited to low-throughput single-protein studies due to issues involved in handling whole proteins, their heterogeneity and the complexity of their analyses.

In the second approach, referred to as the "bottom-up" MS, proteins are enzymatically digested into smaller peptides using a protease such as trypsin. Subsequently, these peptides are introduced into the mass spectrometer and identified by peptide mass fingerprinting or tandem mass spectrometry. Hence, this approach uses identification at the peptide level to infer the existence of proteins pieced back together with de novo repeat detection. The smaller and more uniform fragments are easier to analyze than intact proteins and can be also determined with high accuracy, this "bottom-up" approach is therefore the preferred method of studies in proteomics. A further approach that is beginning to be useful is the intermediate "middle-down" approach in which proteolytic peptides larger than the typical tryptic peptides are analyzed.

=== Protein and peptide fractionation ===
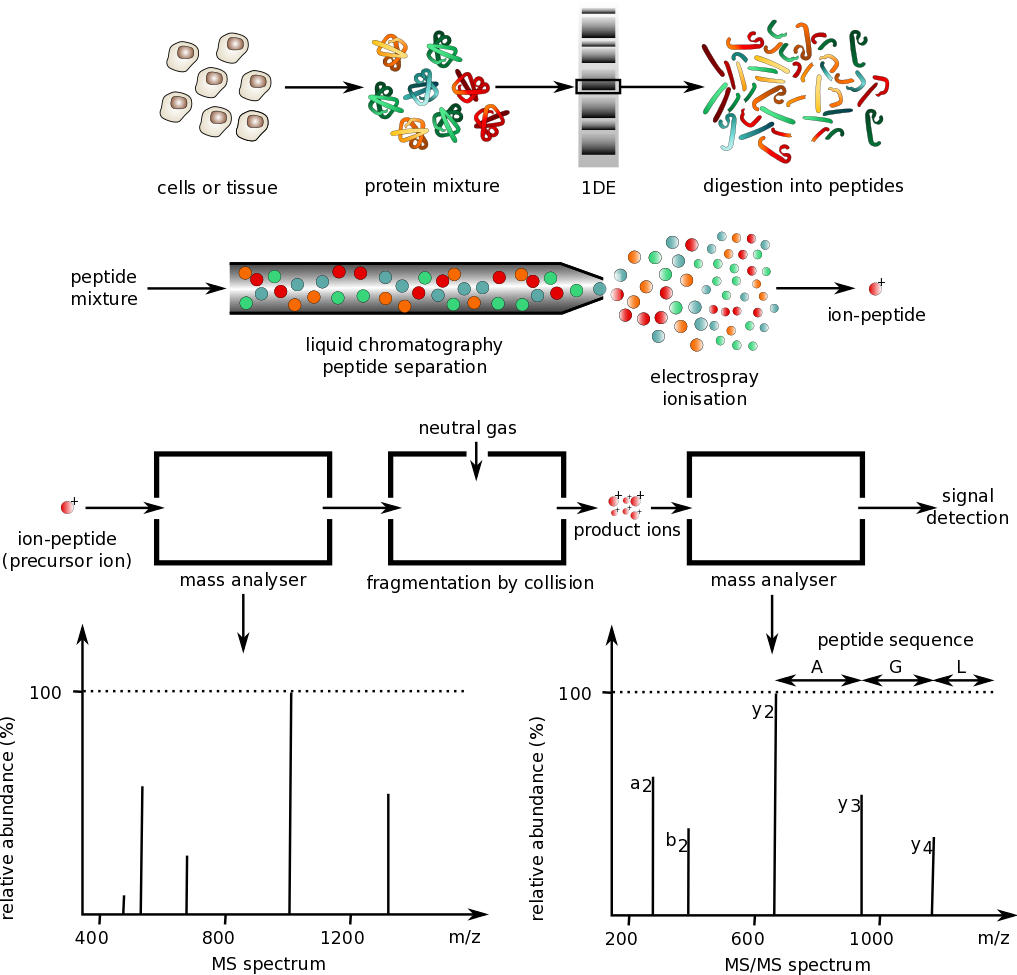
Mass spectrometry protocol

Proteins of interest are usually part of a complex mixture of multiple proteins and molecules, which co-exist in the biological medium. This presents two significant problems. First, the two ionization techniques used for large molecules only work well when the mixture contains roughly equal amounts of material, while in biological samples, different proteins tend to be present in widely differing amounts. If such a mixture is ionized using electrospray or MALDI, the more abundant species have a tendency to "drown" or suppress signals from less abundant ones. Second, mass spectrum from a complex mixture is very difficult to interpret due to the overwhelming number of mixture components. This is exacerbated by the fact that enzymatic digestion of a protein gives rise to a large number of peptide products.

In light of these problems, the methods of one- and two-dimensional gel electrophoresis and high performance liquid chromatography are widely used for separation of proteins. The first method fractionates whole proteins via two-dimensional gel electrophoresis. The first-dimension of 2D gel is isoelectric focusing (IEF). In this dimension, the protein is separated by its isoelectric point (pI) and the second-dimension is SDS-polyacrylamide gel electrophoresis (SDS-PAGE). This dimension separates the protein according to its molecular weight. Once this step is completed in-gel digestion occurs. In some situations, it may be necessary to combine both of these techniques. Gel spots identified on a 2D Gel are usually attributable to one protein. If the identity of the protein is desired, usually the method of in-gel digestion is applied, where the protein spot of interest is excised, and digested proteolytically. The peptide masses resulting from the digestion can be determined by mass spectrometry using peptide mass fingerprinting. If this information does not allow unequivocal identification of the protein, its peptides can be subject to tandem mass spectrometry for de novo sequencing. Small changes in mass and charge can be detected with 2D-PAGE. The disadvantages with this technique are its small dynamic range compared to other methods, some proteins are still difficult to separate due to their acidity, basicity, hydrophobicity, and size (too large or too small).

The second method, high performance liquid chromatography is used to fractionate peptides after enzymatic digestion. Characterization of protein mixtures using HPLC/MS is also called shotgun proteomics and MuDPIT (Multi-Dimensional Protein Identification Technology). A peptide mixture that results from digestion of a protein mixture is fractionated by one or two steps of liquid chromatography. The eluent from the chromatography stage can be either directly introduced to the mass spectrometer through electrospray ionization, or laid down on a series of small spots for later mass analysis using MALDI.

== Applications ==
=== Protein identification ===
There are two main ways MS is used to identify proteins. Peptide mass fingerprinting uses the masses of proteolytic peptides as input to a search of a database of predicted masses that would arise from digestion of a list of known proteins. If a protein sequence in the reference list gives rise to a significant number of predicted masses that match the experimental values, there is some evidence that this protein was present in the original sample. Purification steps therefore limit the throughput of the peptide mass fingerprinting approach. Alternatively, peptides can be fragmented with MS/MS to more definitively identify them.

MS is also the preferred method for the identification of post-translational modifications in proteins versus other approaches such as antibody-based methods.

=== De novo (peptide) sequencing ===
De novo peptide sequencing for mass spectrometry is typically performed without prior knowledge of the amino acid sequence. It is the process of assigning amino acids from peptide fragment masses of a protein. De novo sequencing has proven successful for confirming and expanding upon results from database searches.

As de novo sequencing is based on mass and some amino acids have identical masses (e.g. leucine and isoleucine), accurate manual sequencing can be difficult. Therefore, it may be necessary to utilize a sequence homology search application to work in tandem between a database search and de novo sequencing to address this inherent limitation.

Database searching has the advantage of quickly identifying sequences, provided they have already been documented in a database. Other inherent limitations of database searching include sequence modifications/mutations (some database searches do not adequately account for alterations to the 'documented' sequence, thus can miss valuable information), the unknown (if a sequence is not documented, it will not be found), false positives, and incomplete and corrupted data.

An annotated peptide spectral library can also be used as a reference for protein/peptide identification. It offers the unique strength of reduced search space and increased specificity. The limitations include spectra not included in the library will not be identified, spectra collected from different types of mass spectrometers can have quite distinct features, and reference spectra in the library may contain noise peaks, which may lead to false positive identifications. A number of different algorithmic approaches have been described to identify peptides and proteins from tandem mass spectrometry (MS/MS), peptide de novo sequencing and sequence tag-based searching.

=== Antigen presentation ===
Antigen presentation is the first step in educating the immune system to recognize new pathogens. To this end, antigen presenting cells expose protein fragments via MHC molecules to the immune system. Not all protein fragments bind, however, to the MHC molecules of a certain individual. Using mass spectrometry, the true spectrum of molecules presented to the immune system can be determined.

=== Protein quantitation ===
Quantitative Mass Spectrometry.

Multiple methods allow for the quantitation of proteins by mass spectrometry, and recent advances have enabled quantifying thousands of proteins in single cells. Protein quantification by mass spectrometry benefits from efficient sampling (counting) of many ions per protein compared to other methods. Quantifications can be performed by label-free methods and by multiplexed methods, which use isotopic mass tags as labels. Multiplexed methods can improve both quantitative accuracy and throughput.

Typically, stable (e.g. non-radioactive) heavier isotopes of carbon (^{13}C) or nitrogen (^{15}N) are incorporated into one sample while the other one is labeled with corresponding light isotopes (e.g. ^{12}C and ^{14}N). The two samples are mixed before the analysis. Peptides derived from the different samples can be distinguished due to their mass difference. The ratio of their peak intensities corresponds to the relative abundance ratio of the peptides (and proteins). The first generation of methods for isotope labeling included SILAC (stable isotope labeling by amino acids in cell culture), trypsin-catalyzed ^{18}O labeling, ICAT (isotope coded affinity tagging), and iTRAQ (isobaric tags for relative and absolute quantitation). The more recent generation of multiplexing methods include tandem mass tags (TMT) for DDA data and mTRAQ for multiplexed DIA (plexDIA).

"Semi-quantitative" mass spectrometry can be performed without labeling of samples. Typically, this is done with MALDI analysis (in linear mode). The peak intensity, or the peak area, from individual molecules (typically proteins) is here correlated to the amount of protein in the sample. However, the individual signal depends on the primary structure of the protein, on the complexity of the sample, and on the settings of the instrument. Other types of "label-free" quantitative mass spectrometry, uses the spectral counts (or peptide counts) of digested proteins as a means for determining relative protein amounts.

=== Protein structure determination ===
Characteristics indicative of the 3-dimensional structure of proteins can be probed with mass spectrometry in various ways. Comparing charge state distributions can give information about the structure of a protein. A wide variety of high charge states indicates disorder of the protein, whereas more compact, folded proteins result in lower charge states. By using chemical crosslinking to couple parts of the protein that are close in space, but far apart in sequence, information about the overall structure can be inferred. By following the exchange of amide protons with deuterium from the solvent, it is possible to probe the solvent accessibility of various parts of the protein. Hydrogen-deuterium exchange mass spectrometry has been used to study proteins and their conformations for over 20 years. This type of protein structural analysis can be suitable for proteins that are challenging for other structural methods. Another interesting avenue in protein structural studies is laser-induced covalent labeling. In this technique, solvent-exposed sites of the protein are modified by hydroxyl radicals. Its combination with rapid mixing has been used in protein folding studies.

=== Proteogenomics ===
In what is now commonly referred to as proteogenomics, peptides identified with mass spectrometry are used for improving gene annotations (for example, gene start sites) and protein annotations. Parallel analysis of the genome and the proteome facilitates discovery of post-translational modifications and proteolytic events, especially when comparing multiple species.
