= Metal-coded affinity tag =

Metal-coded affinity tag is a method used for quantitative proteomics by mass spectrometry that uses a metal chelate complex 1,4,7,10-tetraazacyclododecane-1,4,7,10-tetraacetate (DOTA) coupled to different lanthanide ions. The metal complexes attach to the cysteine residues of proteins in a sample.

== Proteomic analysis ==
For bottom-up proteomics, the proteins can be separated by two-dimensional gel electrophoresis and analyzed by matrix-assisted laser desorption/ionization (MALDI) or electrospray ionization mass spectrometry for relative quantification or by inductively coupled plasma mass spectrometry for absolute quantification. For top-down proteomics, the undigested labeled proteins are analyzed.

== See also ==
- Mass cytometry
