= Glycoproteomics =

Glycoproteomics is a branch of proteomics that identifies, catalogs, and characterizes proteins containing carbohydrates as a result of post-translational modifications. Glycosylation is the most common post-translational modification of proteins, but continues to be the least studied on the proteome level. Mass spectrometry (MS) is an analytical technique used to improve the study of these proteins on the proteome level. Glycosylation contributes to several concerted biological mechanisms essential to maintaining physiological function. The study of the glycosylation of proteins is important to understanding certain diseases, like cancer, because a connection between a change in glycosylation and these diseases has been discovered. To study this post-translational modification of proteins, advanced mass spectrometry techniques based on glycoproteomics have been developed to help in terms of therapeutic applications and the discovery of biomarkers.

== Mass spectrometry ==
Mass spectrometry is commonly used to identify the sugar moieties attached, but since there are many different glycan structures attached and different locations of glycosylation, this leads to challenges when attempting to sequence glycoproteins. Using mass spectrometry, there are two methods for glycoprotein analysis. The first strategy is called "top-down" which uses intact glycoproteins for the mass spectrometry analysis without digesting and does not require an extensive sample preparation. The second and most common method for studying glycoproteins is the "bottom-up" strategy that initially cleaves the glycans from the glycoproteins using chemicals or enzymes. The glycans, which are carbohydrates, and proteins are purified, and individually analyzed. Based on the type of linkage that these glycans use to attach to proteins, different methods are used to separate the glycan from the protein. Using mass spectrometry, the glycan structures and sequences of the proteins can be determined, but where the glycans bind to on the protein is sometimes undetermined. The last approach involves glycoprotein digestion using the enzyme, endoprotease, so the digested glycoproteins can then be characterized by mass spectrometry techniques. Using this method, the glycosylated sites can be identified, so these approaches are used in conjunction when trying to identify glycoproteins. As technology progresses, glycoprotein analyses have become more accurate using high-resolution mass spectrometry instrumentations.

== See also ==
- Systems biology
- Phosphoproteomics
