= Hans-Dieter Beckey =

German scientist and mass spectrometrist

- Education: University of Hamburg; University of Bonn
- Scientific career
- Fields: mass spectrometry
- Workplaces: University of Bonn

Hans-Dieter Beckey (8 June 1921 – 18 June 1992) was a German physicist and mass spectrometry researcher known for his work on field desorption.

== Career and Research ==
Beckey graduated from the University of Hamburg in 1950 and then received his PhD in the group of Wilhelm Groth at the University of Bonn in 1952. He wrote his habilitation in 1959 and became full professor of physical chemistry at the University of Bonn in 1966. In 1958, he used field ionization (FI) together with mass spectrometry to transfer ions into the gas phase. Using high field strengths, he was able to show that FI could ionize labile molecules that were not amenable to electron ionization (EI) due to the latter's propensity to fragment ions. He thus established FI as a complementary technique to EI. He also showed that FI is suited to study the decomposition kinetics of organic molecules in the gas phase. However, his most important contribution to mass spectrometry was the invention of field desorption, a soft ionization technique suitable for large molecules including biopolymers. After his illness forced him to cease working, his co-worker Hans-Rolf Schulten continued this work.

Beckey received the Nernst Prize (now the Nernst–Haber–Bodenstein Prize) from the German Bunsen Society for Physical Chemistry in 1964.

Beckey was married to Gudrun Kischke (in 1951) and they had three children. He was forced to resign in 1979 due to an illness that had acquired in 1969. He died in 1992.
