= TGM4 =

Protein-coding gene in the species Homo sapiens

Identifiers
- Aliases: TGM4, TGP, hTGP, TGASE–4, transglutaminase 4
- External IDs: OMIM: 600585; MGI: 3027002; GeneCards: TGM4
Enzyme activity
EC #	BRENDA	ExPASy	KEGG	MetaCyc
2.3.2.13	↗	↗	↗	↗

Gene location (Human)
Chr.	Chromosome 3 (human)
Band	3p21.31	Start	44,874,608 bp
Band	3p21.31	End	44,914,990 bp

Gene location (Mouse)
Chr.	Chromosome 9 (mouse)
Band	9|9 F4	Start	122,863,791 bp
Band	9|9 F4	End	122,896,626 bp
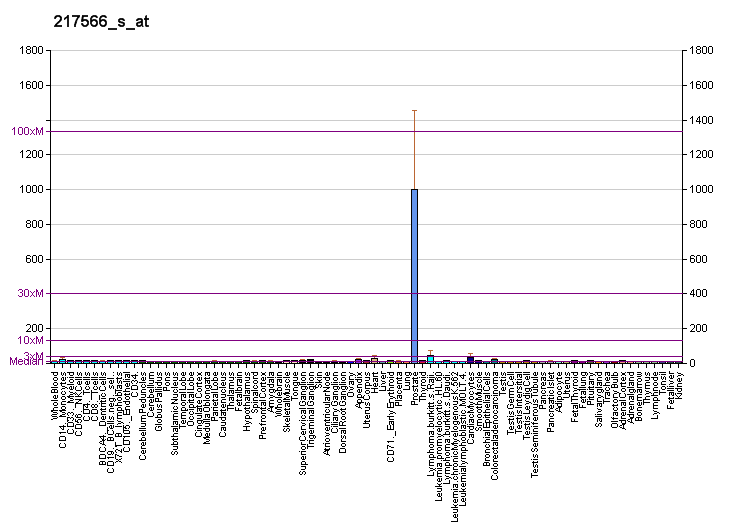

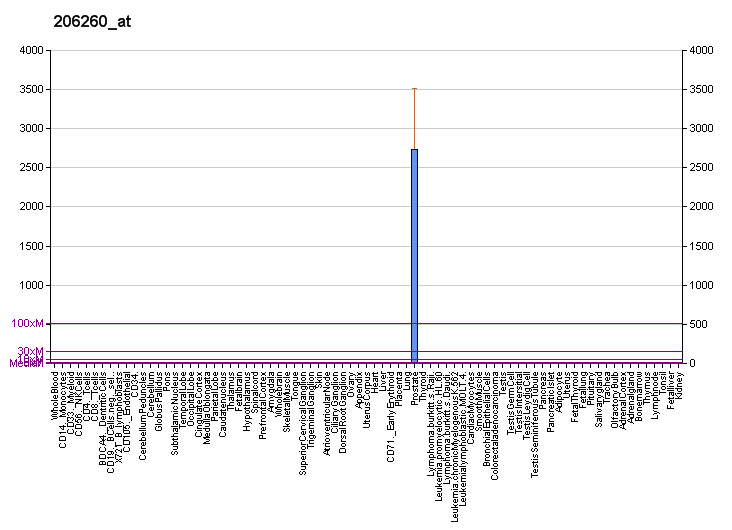
RNA expression pattern
Bgee	Human / Mouse (ortholog); Top expressed in: testicle; prostate; bone marrow; monocyte; appendix; granulocyte; gonad; right testis; left testis; right coronary artery / Top expressed in: neural layer of retina; spinal ganglia; granulocyte; prostate; primary oocyte; embryo; morula; secondary oocyte; muscle of thigh; embryo; More reference expression data
BioGPS	More reference expression data
Gene ontology
Molecular function	transferase activity; acyltransferase activity; protein-glutamine gamma-glutamyltransferase activity; metal ion binding
Cellular component	cytoplasm; extracellular matrix; Golgi apparatus; extracellular exosome; collagen-containing extracellular matrix
Biological process	peptide cross-linking
Sources:Amigo / QuickGO
Orthologs
Databases	NCBI: entry; OMA: entry
Species	Human	Mouse
Entrez	7047	331046
Ensembl	ENSG00000163810; ENSG00000281886	ENSMUSG00000025787
UniProt	P49221	Q8BZH1
RefSeq (mRNA)	NM_003241	NM_177911
RefSeq (protein)	NP_003232	NP_808579
Location (UCSC)	Chr 3: 44.87 – 44.91 Mb	Chr 9: 122.86 – 122.9 Mb
PubMed search
- Wikidata
View/Edit Human	View/Edit Mouse

Protein-glutamine gamma-glutamyltransferase 4 is an enzyme that in humans is encoded by the TGM4 gene.
