= Field desorption =

Method of ion formation

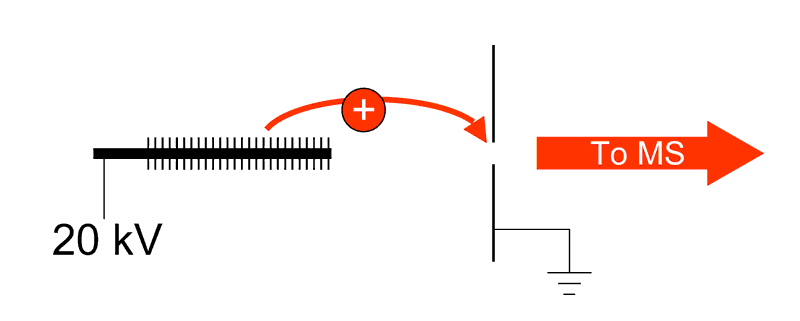
Schematic of field desorption ionization with emitter at left and mass spectrometer at right

Field desorption (FD) is a method of ion formation used in mass spectrometry (MS) in which a high-potential electric field is applied to an emitter with a sharp surface, such as a razor blade, or more commonly, a filament from which tiny "whiskers" have formed. This results in a high electric field which can result in ionization of gaseous molecules of the analyte. Mass spectra produced by FD have little or no fragmentation because FD is a soft ionization method. They are dominated by molecular radical cations M^{+.} and less often, protonated molecules $\ce{[{M}+H]+}$. The technique was first reported by Beckey in 1969. It is also the first ionization method to ionize nonvolatile and thermally labile compounds. One major difference of FD with other ionization methods is that it does not need a primary beam to bombard a sample.

== Mechanism ==
In FD, the analyte is applied as a thin film directly to the emitter, or small crystals of solid materials are placed onto the emitter. Slow heating of the emitter then begins, by passing a high current through the emitter, which is maintained at a high potential (e.g. 5 kilovolts). As heating of the emitter continues, low-vapor pressure materials get desorbed and ionized by alkali metal cation attachment.

=== Ion formation mechanisms ===
Different analytes involve different ionization mechanisms in FD-MS, and four mechanisms are commonly observed, including field ionization, cation attachment, thermal ionization, and proton abstraction.

==== Field ionization ====
In field ionization, electrons are removed from a species by quantum mechanical tunneling in a high electric field, which results in the formation of molecular ions (M ^{+} ̇ in positive ion mode). This ionization method usually takes places in nonpolar or slightly polar organic compounds.

==== Cation attachment ====
In the process of cation attachment, cations (typically H^{+} or Na^{+}) attach themselves to analyte molecules; the desorption of the cation attachment (e.g., MNa^{+}) can then be realized through the emitter heating and high field. The ionization of more polar organic molecules (e.g., ones with aliphatic hydroxyl or amino groups) in FD-MS typically go through this mechanism.

==== Thermal ionization ====
In thermal ionization, the emitter is used to hold and heat the sample, and the analytes are then desorbed from the hot emitter surface. Thermal ionization of preformed ions may apply to the ionization of organic and inorganic salts in FD-MS.

==== Proton abstraction ====
Proton abstraction is different from the three ionization methods mentioned above because negative ions (NI) are formed during the process rather than positive ions. (M-H)^{−} ions are often produced in polar organics in the NI mode.

The first three ionization mechanisms discussed above all have their analogues in NI-FD-MS. In field ionization, molecular anions (M^{−} ̇ ) can be generated. Anion attachment can also lead to the formation of negative ions for some molecules, for example, (M + Cl)^{−}. Thermal desorption usually produces anion (A^{−}) and cluster ion (e.g. CA_{2}^{−}) for salts.

== Emitters ==
Several different emitter configurations have been used for FD emitters, such as single tips, sharp blades and thin wires. Single metal tips can be made from etching wires either by periodically dipping them into molten salts or by electrolysis in aqueous solutions. Compared to other emitter types, the single tips have the advantage that they can reach the highest field strengths. In addition, well-defined geometric shape of a single tip allows accurate calculation of the potential distribution in the space between the tip and the counter electrode. For blades used as emitters, their ruggedness under the high electric field is one of their advantages. Different thin wires were also used as emitters, such as platinum wires and tungsten wires. Platinum wires are fragile, and tungsten wires are much more stable than platinum wires. Among those emitters, carbon-microneedles tungsten wires are the most widely used emitters in FD mass spectrometry.

=== Activation of emitters ===
The growth process of microneedles on emitters is termed ‘activation’. The tips of microneedles can provide high field strength for field desorption, and higher emission current can be obtained due to the increased emission area compared to metal tips. Some activation methods include high-temperature (HT) activation, high-rate (HR) activation, and electrochemical desorption.

In the HT activation mode, a 10 μm tungsten wire is activated outside the mass spectrometer in a vacuum cell containing benzonitrile at a pressure of about 10^{−1} Pa. The tungsten wire serving as the field anode is then heated up to about 1500 K with direct current at a potential of about 10 kV with respect to a cathode. Carbon microneedles can be produced within 8-12 h. HR activation method is to reverse the polarity of the emitter and the counter electrode, which emits a strong electron current. The strong electron current results in the heating of the growing carbon needles and therefore the high rates of the needle growth. In the HR activation mode, needles of other metals (iron, nickel or cobalt) and of alloys can also be generated. Instead of carbon microneedles, metallic dendrites (mainly of nickel or cobalt) can be produced on thin wires through electrochemical desorption process. This method is even faster than HR method.

== Sample loading techniques ==
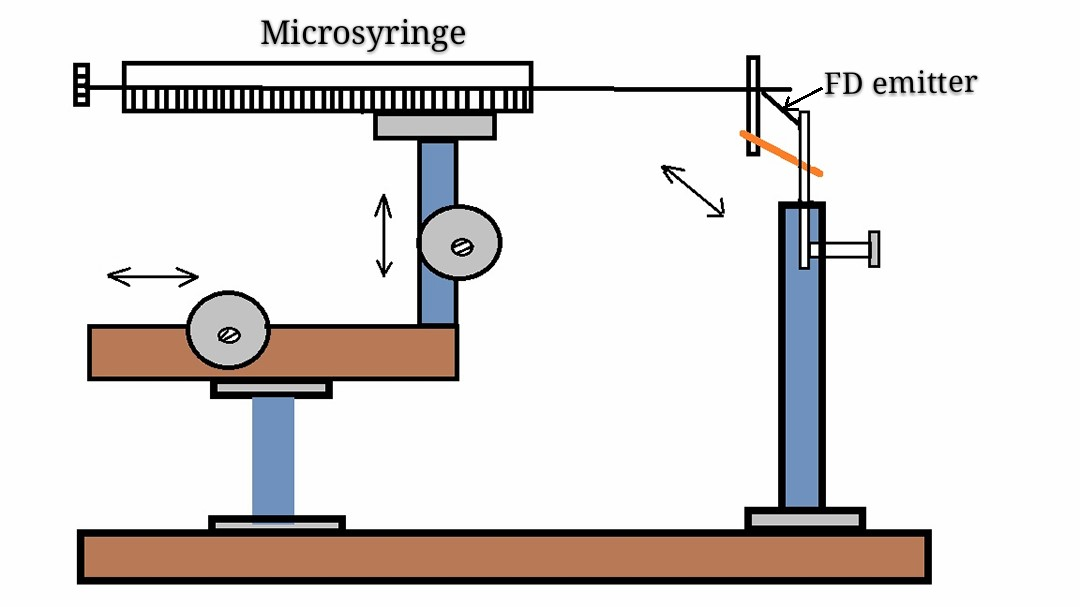
Apparatus for the syringe technique in FD sample loading

There are mainly two methods for loading samples onto FD emitters: the emitter-dipping technique and the syringe technique. Emitter-dipping technique is simple and commonly used in most laboratories. In this technique, the solid samples are dissolved or suspended in a suitable medium, and then an activated emitter (usually a tungsten wire with many microneedles) is dipped into the solution and drawn out again. When the wire is removed from the solution, the solution of a volume about 10^{−2} μL adheres to the microneedles (an average length of 30 μm) or remains between them. The other technique, syringe technique, applies to the compounds which are less concentrated than 10^{−5} M. A droplet of the solution from a microsyringe which is fitted to a micromanipulator is deposited uniformly on the microneedles. After evaporation of the solvent, the procedure for the two techniques can be repeated several times to load more samples. The syringe technique has the advantage that measured volumes of the solution can be accurately dispensed on the center of the wire.

=== Liquid injection ===
The recently developed liquid injection FD ionization (LIFDI) technique "presents a major breakthrough for FD-MS of reactive analytes": Transition metal complexes are neutral and due to their reactivity, do not undergo protonation or ion attachment. They benefit from both: the soft FD ionization and the safe and simple LIFDI transfer of air/moisture sensitive analyte solution. This transfer occurs from the Schlenk flask to the FD emitter in the ion source through a fused silica capillary without breaking the vacuum. LIFDI has been successfully coupled to a Fourier transform ion cyclotron resonance (FTICR) mass spectrometer. The coupled system enables analysis of sulphur-containing materials in crude oil under extremely high mass resolving power conditions.

== Applications ==
A major application of FD is to determine the molecular mass of a large variety of thermally labile and stable nonvolatile, nonpolar, and polar organic and organometallic compounds, and of molecules from biochemical and environmental sources.

=== Qualitative analysis ===
For qualitative analysis, FD-MS can be applied to areas in biochemistry, medicine, salts, polymers and environmental analysis. For example, in biochemistry, it can be used to characterize peptides, nucleosides and nucleotides, pesticides, and vitamins. In medicine, it can be applied to cancer drugs and their metabolites, and antibiotics.

=== Quantitative analysis of mixtures ===
FD-MS can also be used for quantitative analysis when the method of internal standard is applied. There are two common modes of adding an internal standard: either addition of a homologous compound of known weight to the sample, or addition of an isotopically substituted compound of known weight to it.

Many earlier applications of FD to analysis of polar and nonvolatile analytes such as polymers and biological molecules have largely been supplanted by newer ionization techniques. However, FD remains one of the only ionization techniques that can produce simple mass spectra with molecular information from hydrocarbons and other particular analytes. The most commonly encountered application of FD at the present time is the analysis of complex mixtures of hydrocarbons such as that found in petroleum fractions.

== Advantages and disadvantages ==
FD-MS has many advantages that it is applicable to any type of solvent, and only small amount of sample is needed for analysis. In addition, since it is a soft ionization, a clean mass spectrum (very limited or no fragmentation) will be produced. It also has some disadvantages. For example, the emitters are fragile, and only small- and medium-sized molecules can be analysed in FD-MS. Besides, if too much salt were present, it would be difficult to obtain stable ion emission currents. In addition, the FD spectrum of a compound is less reproducible than spectrum from other ionization methods. The FD methods are good for qualitative analysis but less suitable for quantitative analysis of complex mixtures.
