= Difference gel electrophoresis =

Difference gel electrophoresis (DIGE) is a form of gel electrophoresis where up to three different protein samples can be labeled with size-matched, charge-matched spectrally resolvable fluorescent dyes (for example Cy3, Cy5, Cy2) prior to two dimensional gel electrophoresis.

== Procedure ==
The three samples are mixed and loaded onto IEF (isoelectric focusing chromatography) for first dimension and the strip is transferred to a SDS PAGE. After the gel electrophoresis, the gel is scanned with the excitation wavelength of each dye one after the other, so each sample can be seen separately (if we scan the gel at the excitation wavelength of the Cy3 dye, we will see in the gel only the sample that was labeled with that dye). This technique is used to see changes in protein abundance (for example, between a sample of a healthy person and a sample of a person with disease), post-translational modifications, truncations and any modification that might change the size or isoelectric point of proteins. The binary shifts might be left to right (change in isoelectric point), vertical (change in size) or diagonal (change in both size and isoelectric point). Reciprocal Labeling is done to make sure the changes seen are not due to dye-dependent interactions.

== Advantages ==
It overcomes limitations in traditional 2D electrophoresis that are due to inter-gel variation. This can be considerable even with identical samples. Since the proteins from the different sample types (e.g. healthy/diseased, virulent/non-virulent) are run on the same gel they can be directly compared. To do this with traditional 2D electrophoresis requires large numbers of time-consuming repeats.

== Standards ==
In experiments comprising several gels, a common technique is to include an internal standard in each gel. The internal standard is prepared by mixing together several or all of the samples in the experiment. This allows the measurement of the abundance of a protein in each sample relative to the internal standard. Since the amounts of each protein in the internal standard is known to be the same in every gel, this method reduces inter-gel variation.

== See also ==
- PROTOMAP
