= Tandem mass tag =

Chemical labels used to quantify biomolecules via mass spectrometry

In analytical chemistry, a tandem mass tag (TMT) is a chemical label that facilitates sample multiplexing in mass spectrometry (MS)-based quantification and identification of biological macromolecules such as proteins, peptides and nucleic acids. TMT belongs to a family of reagents referred to as isobaric mass tags which are a set of molecules with the same mass, but yield reporter ions of differing mass after fragmentation. The relative ratio of the measured reporter ions represents the relative abundance of the tagged molecule, although ion suppression has a detrimental effect on accuracy. Despite these complications, TMT-based proteomics has been shown to afford higher precision than label-free quantification. In addition to aiding in protein quantification, TMT tags can also increase the detection sensitivity of certain highly hydrophilic analytes, such as phosphopeptides, in RPLC-MS analyses.

== Versions ==
There are currently six varieties of TMT available: TMTzero, a non-isotopically substituted core structure; TMTduplex, an isobaric pair of mass tags with a single isotopic substitution; TMTsixplex, an isobaric set of six mass tags with five isotopic substitutions; TMT 10-plex – a set of 10 isotopic mass tags which use the TMTsixplex reporter region, but use different elemental isotope to create a mass difference of 0.0063 Da, TMTpro a 16 plex version with a different reporter and mass normalizer than the original TMT, and TMTpro Zero.

Mass Shift of Different TMT Reagents
| | Mass shift |
|---|---|
| TMT 0 | 224.152478 |
| TMT 2 | 225.155833 |
| TMT 6/10 | 229.162932 |
| TMT 11 | 229.169252 |
| TMT Pro-zero | 295.18959 |
| TMT Pro | 304.2071 |

The tags contain four regions, namely a mass reporter region (M), a cleavable linker region (F), a mass normalization region (N) and a protein reactive group (R). The chemical structures of all the tags are identical but each contains isotopes substituted at various positions, such that the mass reporter and mass normalization regions have different molecular masses in each tag. The combined M-F-N-R regions of the tags have the same total molecular weights and structure so that during chromatographic or electrophoretic separation and in single MS mode, molecules labelled with different tags are indistinguishable. Upon fragmentation in MS/MS mode, sequence information is obtained from fragmentation of the peptide back bone and quantification data are simultaneously obtained from fragmentation of the tags, giving rise to mass reporter ions.

== Quantification of labeled peptides ==
The structures of TMT tags are publicly available through the unimod database at unimod.org and hence, mass spectrometry software such as Mascot are able to account for the tag masses. Additionally, as of version 2.2, Mascot has the capability to quantify using TMT and other isobaric mass tags without the use of additional software. Intuitively, the trust associated with a protein measurement depends on the similarity of ratios from different peptides and the signal level of these measurements. A mathematically rigorous approach called BACIQ, that integrates peptide intensities and peptide-measurement agreement into confidence intervals for protein ratios has emerged. The TKO standard can be used to assess interference

== Isobaric carrier concept ==
TMT tags are commonly used to label samples of equal abundance. If one of the labeled samples is more abundant, however, it may increase the sensitivity of the analysis for all samples. Such isobarically labeled samples are referred to as isobaric carriers. They were introduced for single-cell protein analysis by mass spectrometry, and have found many other applications.
