= Isotope-coded affinity tag =

An isotope-coded affinity tag (ICAT) is an in-vitro isotopic labeling method used for quantitative proteomics by mass spectrometry that uses chemical labeling reagents. These chemical probes consist of three elements: a reactive group for labeling an amino acid side chain (e.g., iodoacetamide to modify cysteine residues), an isotopically coded linker, and a tag (e.g., biotin) for the affinity isolation of labeled proteins/peptides. The samples are combined and then separated through chromatography, then sent through a mass spectrometer to determine the mass-to-charge ratio between the proteins. Only cysteine containing peptides can be analysed. Since only cysteine containing peptides are analysed, often the post translational modification is lost.

== Development ==
The original tags were developed using deuterium, but later the same group redesigned the tags using 13C instead to circumvent issues of peak separation during liquid chromatography due to the deuterium interacting with the stationary phase of the column.

== Quantitative proteomics ==
For the quantitative comparison of two proteomes, one sample is labeled with the isotopically light (d0) probe and the other with the isotopically heavy (d8) version. To minimize error, both samples are then combined, digested with a protease (i.e., trypsin), and subjected to avidin affinity chromatography to isolate peptides labeled with isotope-coded tagging reagents. These peptides are then analyzed by liquid chromatography-mass spectrometry (LC-MS). The ratios of signal intensities of differentially mass-tagged peptide pairs are quantified to determine the relative levels of proteins in the two samples.
