= Isobaric tag for relative and absolute quantitation =

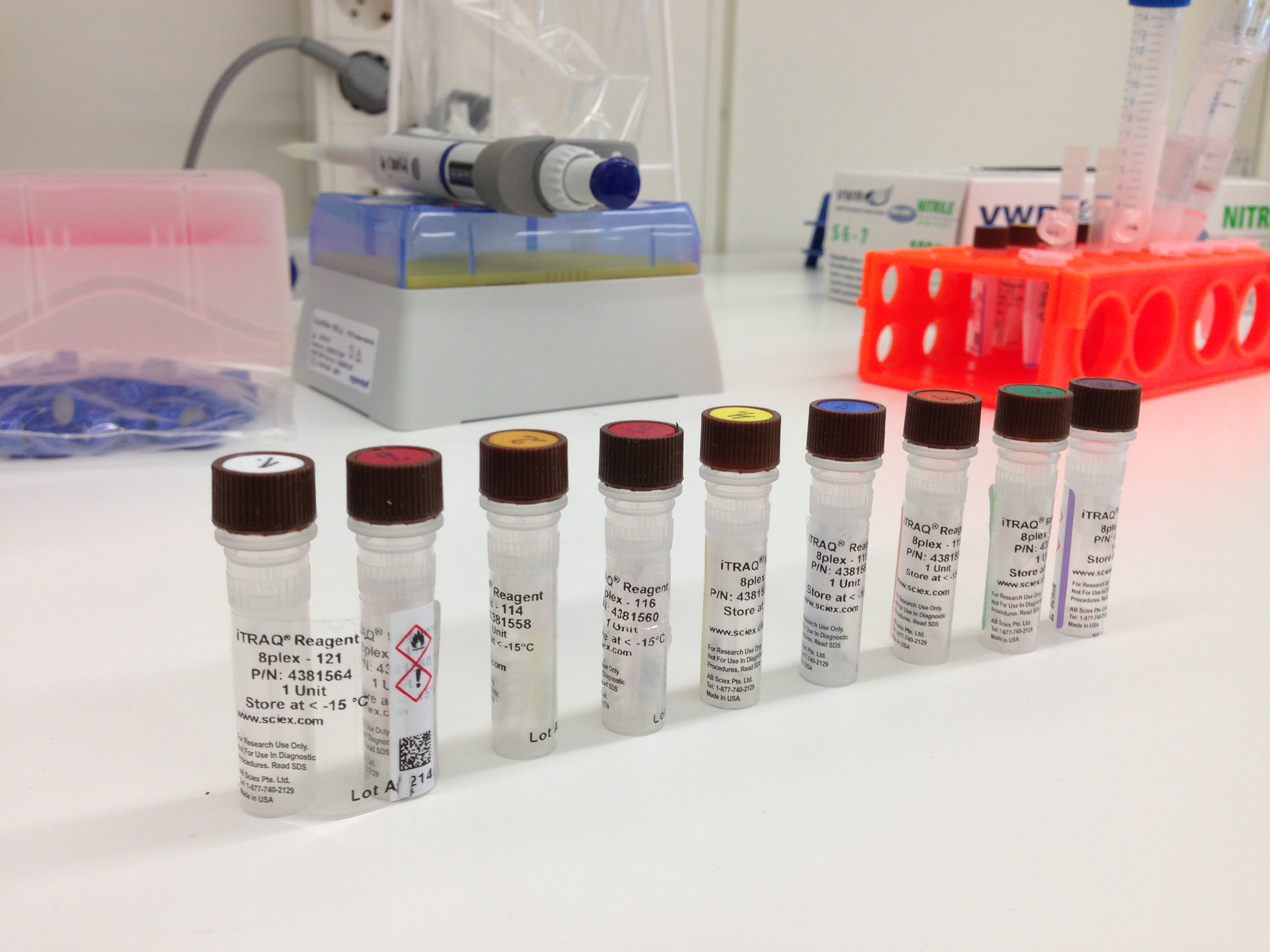
8plex iTRAQ kit

Isobaric tags for relative and absolute quantitation (iTRAQ) is an isobaric labeling method used in quantitative proteomics by tandem mass spectrometry to determine the amount of proteins from different sources in a single experiment. It uses stable isotope labeled molecules that can be covalent bonded to the N-terminus and side chain amines of proteins.

== Procedure ==
The ITRAQ method is based on the covalent labeling of the N-terminus and side chain amines of peptides from protein digestions with tags of varying mass. There are currently two mainly used reagents: 4-plex and 8-plex, which can be used to label all peptides from different samples/treatments. These samples are then pooled and usually fractionated by liquid chromatography and analyzed by tandem mass spectrometry (MS/MS). A database search is then performed using the fragmentation data to identify the labeled peptides and hence the corresponding proteins. The fragmentation of the attached tag generates a low molecular mass reporter ion that can be used to relatively quantify the peptides and the proteins from which they originated. Absolute quantification is possible using internal peptide standards with known concentrations.

== Data evaluation ==
At the peptide level, the signals of the reporter ions of each MS/MS spectrum allow for calculating the relative abundance (ratio) of the peptide(s) identified by this spectrum. The abundance of the reporter ions may consist of more than one single signal in the MS/MS data and the signals have to be integrated in some way from the histogram spectrum.

At the protein level, the combined ratios a proteins' peptides represent the relative quantification of that protein.

The MS/MS spectra can be analyzed using software that is freely available: i-Tracker and jTraqX
