= Stable isotope labeling by amino acids in cell culture =

Laboratory technique for quantitative proteomics

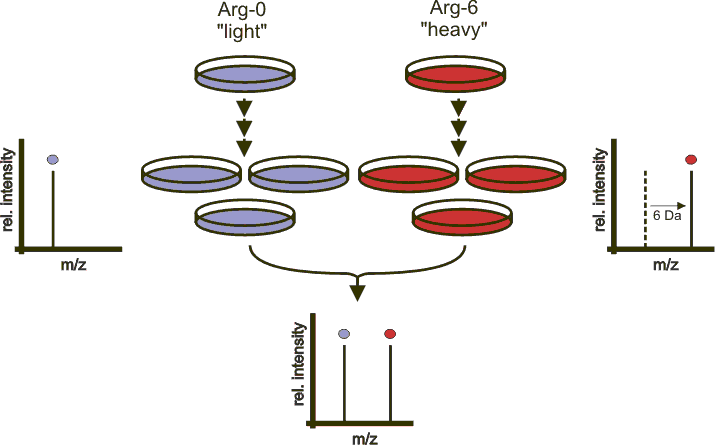
The principle of SILAC. Cells are differentially labeled by growing them in light medium with normal arginine (Arg-0, blue color) or medium with heavy arginine (Arg-6, red color). Metabolic incorporation of the amino acids into the proteins results in a mass shift of the corresponding peptides. This mass shift can be detected by a mass spectrometer as indicated by the depicted mass spectra. When both samples are combined, the ratio of peak intensities in the mass spectrum reflects the relative protein abundance. In this example, the labeled protein has the same abundance in both samples (ratio 1).

Stable isotope labeling by amino acids in cell culture (SILAC) is a technique based on mass spectrometry that detects differences in protein abundance among samples using non-radioactive isotopic labeling. It is a popular method for quantitative proteomics.

== Procedure ==
Two populations of cells are cultivated in cell culture. One of the cell populations is fed with growth medium containing normal amino acids. In contrast, the second population is fed with growth medium containing amino acids labeled with stable (non-radioactive) heavy isotopes. For example, the medium can contain arginine labeled with six carbon-13 atoms (^{13}C) instead of the normal carbon-12 (^{12}C). When the cells are growing in this medium, they incorporate the heavy arginine into all of their proteins. Thereafter, all peptides containing a single arginine are 6 Da heavier than their normal counterparts. Alternatively, uniform labeling with ^{13}C or ^{15}N can be used. Proteins from both cell populations are combined and analyzed together by mass spectrometry as pairs of chemically identical peptides of different stable-isotope composition can be differentiated in a mass spectrometer owing to their mass difference. The ratio of peak intensities in the mass spectrum for such peptide pairs reflects the abundance ratio for the two proteins.

== Applications ==
A SILAC approach involving incorporation of tyrosine labeled with nine carbon-13 atoms (^{13}C) instead of the normal carbon-12 (^{12}C) has been utilized to study tyrosine kinase substrates in signaling pathways. SILAC has emerged as a very powerful method to study cell signaling, post translation modifications such as phosphorylation, protein–protein interaction and regulation of gene expression. In addition, SILAC has become an important method in secretomics, the global study of secreted proteins and secretory pathways. It can be used to distinguish between proteins secreted by cells in culture and serum contaminants. It has also been adapted as a 'forward+reverse' SILAC method for simultaneous labeling of host and microbe, which enables the study of host-microbe interactions. Standardized protocols of SILAC for various applications have also been published.

== Pulsed SILAC ==
Pulsed SILAC (pSILAC) is a variation of the SILAC method where the labelled amino acids are added to the growth medium for only a short period of time. This allows monitoring differences in de novo protein production rather than raw concentration.

== NeuCode SILAC ==
Traditionally the level of multiplexing in SILAC was limited due to the number of SILAC isotopes available. Recently, a new technique called NeuCode (neutron encoding) SILAC, has augmented the level of multiplexing achievable with metabolic labeling (up to 4). The NeuCode amino acid method is similar to SILAC but differs in that the labeling only utilizes heavy amino acids. The use of only heavy amino acids eliminates the need for 100% incorporation of amino acids needed for SILAC. The increased multiplexing capability of NeuCode amino acids is from the use of mass defects from extra neutrons in the stable isotopes. These small mass differences however need to be resolved on high-resolution mass spectrometers.
