= Electron capture ionization =

Electron capture ionization is the ionization of a gas phase atom or molecule by attachment of an electron to create an ion of the form $\ce{A^-}$. The reaction is

$$\ce{A + e^- ->[M]A^-}$$

where the M over the arrow denotes that to conserve energy and momentum a third body is required (the molecularity of the reaction is three).

Electron capture can be used in conjunction with chemical ionization.

== Electron-capture mass spectrometry ==
Electron-capture mass spectrometry (EC-MS) is a type of mass spectrometry that uses electron capture ionization to form negative ions from chemical compounds with positive electron affinities. The approach is particularly effective for electrophiles. In contrast to electron ionization, EC-MS uses low energy electrons in a gas discharge. EC-MS will cause less fragmentation of molecules compared to electron ionization.

=== Negative ion formation ===
==== Resonance electron capture ====
Resonance electron capture is also known as nondissociative EC. The compound captures an electron to form a radical anion. The energy of the electrons are about 0 eV. The electrons can be created in the Electron Ionization source with moderating gas such as H_{2}, CH_{4}, i-C_{4}H_{10}, NH_{3}, N_{2}, and Ar. After the ion captures the electron, the complex formed can stabilize during collisions and produce a stable anion that can be detected in a mass spectrometer.

AB + e^{−} → AB^{−•}

==== Dissociative resonance capture ====
In dissociative resonance capture, the compound fragments resulting in electron capture dissociation (ECD). ECD forms an anion fragment and a radical fragment. The energy of the electrons are from 0-15 eV, but the optimum energy can vary depending on the compound.

$$\ce{AB{} + e^- -> A^-{} + B^{\bullet}}$$

==== Ion-pair formation ====
With electrons of energy greater than 10 ev, negative ions can also be formed through ion-pair formation.

AB + e^{−} → A^{−} + B^{+} + e^{−}

Calibration of the mass spectrometer is important in electron capture ionization mode. A calibration compound is needed to ensure reproducibility in EC-MS. It is used to ensure that the mass scale used is correct and that the groups of ions are constant on a regular basis.

Fragmentation in ECI has been studied by tandem mass spectrometry.

The technique can be used with gas chromatography-mass spectrometry.

== Electron capture detector ==
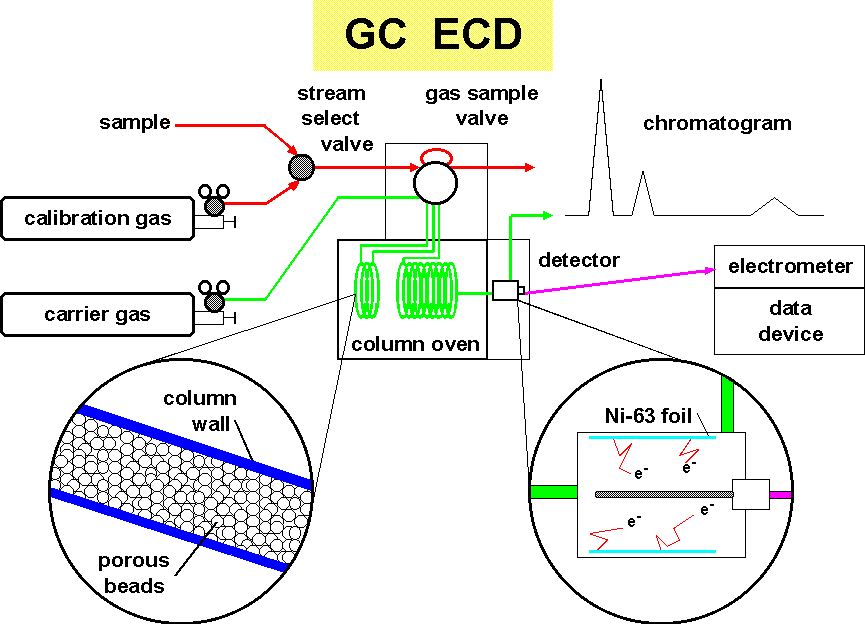
Diagram of a gas chromatograph coupled to an electron capture detector

An electron capture detector most often uses a radioactive source to generate electrons used for ionization. Some examples of radioactive isotopes used are ^{3}H, ^{63}Ni, ^{85}Kr, and ^{90}Sr. The gas in the detector chamber is ionized by the radiation particles. Nitrogen, argon and helium are common carrier gases used in the ECD. Argon and helium need to be combined with another gas, such as methane, in order to prevent immediate conversion into metastable ions. The combination will extend the lifetime of the metastable ions (10^{−6} seconds). The methane will cool the electrons during the collisions. The addition of methane will enhance the ability to form negative ions under high pressure because it will adjust the thermal energy to be similar to the energy distribution of the ions. Methane is the most common gas used because it can produce many positive ions when it collides with electrons. These positive ions will then form low energy electrons used for ionization:

$\ce{2CH4+ + 2e^- -> CH4+ + CH3+ + H + \underbrace{2e^-}_{(secondary)} + \underbrace{2e^-}_{(primary)}}$

An ECD is used in some gas chromatography systems.

== Applications ==
EC-MS (Electron-capture mass spectrometry) has been used for identifying trace levels of chlorinated contaminants in the environment such as polychlorinated biphenyls (PCBs), polychlorinated dibenzo-p-dioxins (PCDDs) and dibenzofurans (PCDFs), and other polychlorinated compounds. Pesticide derivatives, nitrogen containing herbicides, and phosphorus-containing insecticides have also been detected in EC-MS.

Bile acids can detected in various body fluids by using GC-EC-MS. Oxidative damage can also be monitored in trace amounts by analyzing oxidized phenylalanine using GC-EC-MS.

== Advantages ==
EC-MS is a sensitive ionization method. Forming negative ions through electron capture ionization is more sensitive than forming positive ions through chemical ionization.

It is a selective ionization technique that can prevent the formation of common matrices found in environmental contaminants during ionization. Electron capture ionization will have less interference from these matrices compared to electron ionization.

Electron capture mass spectra can distinguish between certain isomers that EI-MS cannot.

== Limitations ==
Different energies in the ion source can cause variations in negative ion formation and make the mass spectra difficult to duplicate. Results shown in the mass spectrum can vary from instrument to instrument.

The temperature of the ion source needs to be monitored. An increase in fragment ions occurs at higher temperatures. Lower temperatures will lower the energy of electrons. Set temperatures can vary, but it is important for electron energy to approach thermal levels for resonance electron capture to occur.

Pressure of the added enhancement gas needs to be determined. Increasing the pressure will help stabilize the anions and extend the lifetimes of the negative ions. If the pressure is too high, not as many ions can exit the ion source.

Analysis should be done using low sample loads for GC-EC-MS. The amount of sample will affect the ion abundance and cause variations in data.

== See also ==
- Electron capture dissociation
