= Alpha cleavage =

Alpha-cleavage (α-cleavage) in organic chemistry refers to the act of breaking the carbon-carbon bond adjacent to the carbon bearing a specified functional group.

== Mass spectrometry ==
Generally this topic is discussed when covering tandem mass spectrometry fragmentation and occurs generally by the same mechanisms.

For example, of a mechanism of alpha-cleavage, an electron is knocked off an atom (usually by electron collision) to form a radical cation. Electron removal generally happens in the following order: 1) lone pair electrons, 2) pi bond electrons, 3) sigma bond electrons.

One of the lone pair electrons moves down to form a pi bond with an electron from an adjacent (alpha) bond. The other electron from the bond moves to an adjacent atom (not one adjacent to the lone pair atom) creating a radical. This creates a double bond adjacent to the lone pair atom (oxygen is a good example) and breaks/cleaves the bond from which the two electrons were removed.

Example of alpha cleavage

In molecules containing carbonyl groups, alpha-cleavage often competes with McLafferty rearrangement.

== Photochemistry ==
In photochemistry, it is the homolytic cleavage of a bond adjacent to a specified group.

== See also ==
- Inductive cleavage
