= Neil Kelleher (scientist) =

American chemist

Neil L. Kelleher
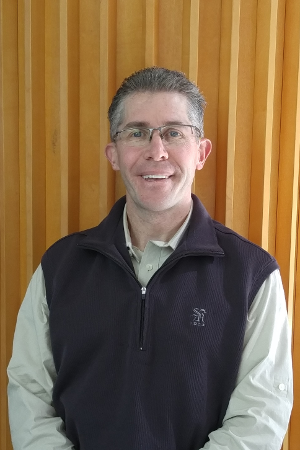
- Born: April 28, 1970 (age 56)
- Education: Pacific Lutheran University; Cornell University
- Known for: Mass spectrometry Top-down proteomics Electron-capture dissociation
- Scientific career
- Fields: Chemist; Biochemist
- Workplaces: University of Illinois at Urbana–Champaign; Northwestern University
- Doctoral advisor: Fred McLafferty; Tadhg Begley

Neil L. Kelleher is the Walter and Mary Elizabeth Glass Professor of Chemistry, Molecular Biosciences, and Medicine at Northwestern University. His research focuses on mass spectrometry, primarily its application to proteomics. He is known mainly for top-down proteomics and the development of the fragmentation technique of electron-capture dissociation with Roman Zubarev while in Fred McLafferty's lab at Cornell University.

== Early life and education ==
- B.S. Pacific Lutheran University
- M.S. and Ph.D. Cornell University

== Research interests ==
- Mass spectrometry
- Electron-capture dissociation
- Proteomics
  - Top-down proteomics

== Awards ==
- Biemann Medal, 2009
- Pittsburgh Conference Achievement Award, 2008
- Pfizer Award in Enzyme Chemistry (American Chemical Society, Division of Biological Chemistry), 2006
- A.F. Findeis Award in Measurement Science (American Chemical Society, Division of Analytical Chemistry), 2006
- Beckman Fellow, 2002-2003
- Presidential Early Career Award
- Alfred P. Sloan Fellow
- Packard Fellow
- NSF CAREER Award
- Lilly Analytical Chemistry Award
- Burroughs Wellcome Fund Young Investigator
- Searle Scholar
- Fulbright Scholar
