= Béla Paizs =

Hungarian scientist

- Awards: Biemann Medal
- Scientific career
- Fields: Proteomics

Béla Paizs is a Hungarian bioinformatician.

His research interests revolve around fragmentation of peptides in mass spectrometry. In top-down proteomics, the interpretation of fragment ion spectra of peptides is a crucial step. The research of Béla Paizs have led to detailed characterization of peptide fragment ion structures and dissociation mechanisms, and have shown underlying fundamental physical and chemical principles. His work has been recognized with the American Society for Mass Spectrometry Biemann Medal in 2011.

Paizs received his Ph.D. in Chemistry in 1998 from Eötvös University in Budapest and graduated with summa cum laude honors. He worked as postdoctoral fellow there and later at the DKFZ in Heidelberg. He held a position as group leader since 2004 at the German Cancer Research Center in Heidelberg until 2013 when he moved to Bangor University.
