= Infrared multiphoton dissociation =

Mass spectrometry technique

Infrared multiple photon dissociation
- Acronym: IRMPD

Other techniques
- Related: Blackbody infrared radiative dissociation Electron capture dissociation Collision-induced dissociation

Infrared multiple photon dissociation (IRMPD) is a technique used in mass spectrometry to fragment molecules in the gas phase usually for structural analysis of the original (parent) molecule.

== How it works ==
An infrared laser is directed through a window into the vacuum of the mass spectrometer where the ions are. The mechanism of fragmentation involves the absorption by a given ion of multiple infrared photons. The parent ion becomes excited into more energetic vibrational states until a bond(s) is broken resulting in gas phase fragments of the parent ion. In the case of powerful laser pulses, the dissociation proceeds via inner-valence ionization of electrons.

IRMPD is most often used in Fourier transform ion cyclotron resonance mass spectrometry.

== Infrared photodissociation spectroscopy ==
By applying intense tunable IR lasers, like IR-OPOs or IR free electron lasers, the wavelength dependence of the IRMPD yield can be studied. This infrared photodissociation spectroscopy allows for the measurement of vibrational spectra of (unstable) species that can only be prepared in the gas phase. Such species include molecular ions but also neutral species like metal clusters that can be gently ionized after interaction with the IR light for their mass spectrometric detection.

== Analytical applications ==
The combination of mass spectrometry and IRMPD with tunable lasers (IR ion spectroscopy) is increasingly recognized as a powerful tool for small-molecule identification. Examples are metabomics, where biomarkers are identified in body fluids (urine, blood, cerebrospinal) and forensic sciences, where isomeric designer drugs were identified in seized samples.

== Isotope separation ==
Due to the relatively large differences in IR absorption frequencies that are due to different resonance frequencies for molecules containing different isotopes, this technique has been suggested as a way to perform Isotope separation with difficult-to-separate isotopes, in a single pass. For example, molecules of UF_{6} containing U-235 might be ionized completely as a result of such a laser resonance, leaving UF_{6} containing the heavier U-238 intact.

== See also ==
- Infrared spectroscopy
- Tandem mass spectrometry
- Photodissociation
- Blackbody infrared radiative dissociation
- Electron capture dissociation
- Collision-induced dissociation is another, more common, method to fragment gas phase ions.
