= Linear ion trap =

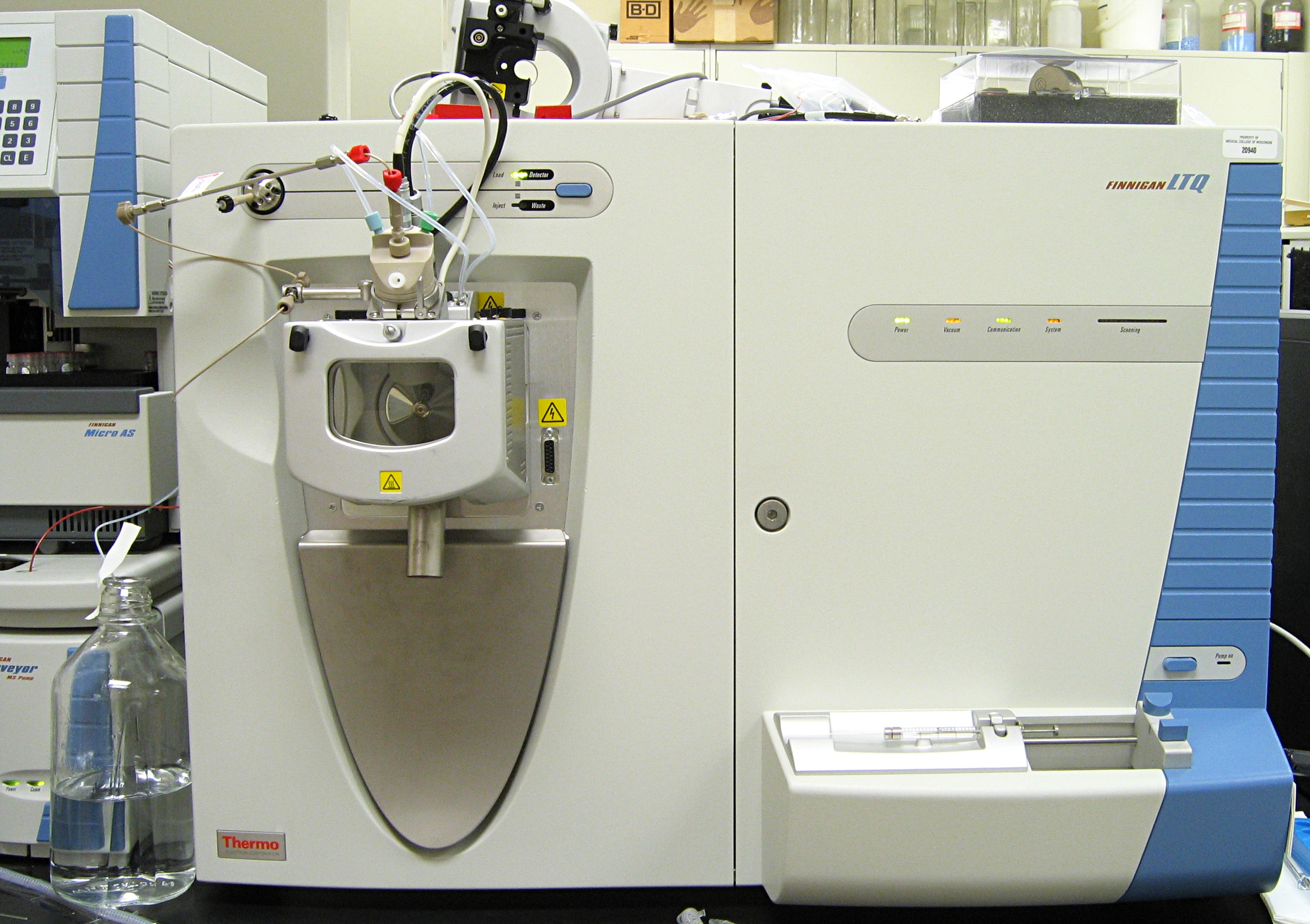
A Thermo Finnigan LTQ (linear trap quadrupole)

The linear ion trap (LIT) is a type of ion trap mass spectrometer.

In a LIT, ions are confined radially by a two-dimensional radio frequency (RF) field, and axially by stopping potentials applied to end electrodes. LITs have high injection efficiencies and high ion storage capacities.

== History ==
One of the first LITs was constructed in 1969, by Dierdre A. Church, who bent linear quadrupoles into closed circle and racetrack geometries and demonstrated storage of ^{3}He^{+} and H^{+} ions for several minutes.

Earlier, Drees and Paul described a circular quadrupole. However, it was used to produce and confine a plasma, not to store ions. In 1989, Prestage, Dick, and Malecki described that ions could be trapped in the linear quadrupole trap system to enhance ion-molecule reactions, thus it can be used to study spectroscopy of stored ions.

== How it works ==
The LIT uses a set of quadrupole rods to confine ions radially and a static electrical potential on the end electrodes to confine the ions axially. The LIT can be used as a mass filter or as a trap by creating a potential well for the ions along the axis of the trap. The mass of trapped ions may be determined if the m/z lies between defined parameters.

Advantages of the LIT design are high ion storage capacity, high scan rate, and simplicity of construction. Although quadrupole rod alignment is critical, adding a quality control constraint to their production, this constraint is additionally present in the machining requirements of the 3D trap.

=== Selective mode and scanning mode ===
Ions are either injected into or created within the interior of the LIT. They are confined by application of appropriate RF and DC voltages with their final position maintained within the center section of the LIT. The RF voltage is adjusted and multi-frequency resonance ejection waveforms are applied to the trap to eliminate all but the desired ions in preparation for subsequent fragmentation and mass analysis. The voltages applied to the ion trap are adjusted to stabilize the selected ions and to allow for collisional cooling in preparation for excitation.

The energy of the selected ions is increased by application of a supplemental resonance excitation voltage applied to all segments of two rods located on the X-axis. This increase of energy causes dissociation of the selected ions due to collisions with damping gas. The product ions formed are retained in the trapping field. Scanning the contents of the trap to produce a mass spectrum is accomplished by linearly increasing the RF voltage applied to all sections of the trap and utilizing a supplemental resonance ejection voltage. These changes sequentially move ions from within the stability diagram to a position where they become unstable in the x-direction and leave the trapping field for detection. Ions are accelerated into two high voltage dynodes where ions produce secondary electrons. This signal is subsequently amplified by two electron multipliers and the analog signals are then integrated together and digitized.

== Combination with other mass analyzers ==
LITs can be used as stand alone mass analyzers, and they can be combined with other mass analyzers, such as 3D Paul ion traps, TOF mass spectrometers, FTMS, and other kind of mass analyzers.

=== Linear traps and 3D trap ===
3D ion trap (or Paul trap) mass spectrometers are widely used but have limitations. With a continuous source, such as one utilizing electrospray ionization (ESI), ions generated while the 3D trap is processing other ions are not used, thereby limiting the duty cycle. Furthermore, the total number of ions that can be stored in a 3D ion trap is limited by space charge effects. Combining a linear trap with a 3D trap can help overcome these limitations.

Recently, Hardman and Makarov have described the use of a linear quadrupole trap to store ions formed by ESI for injection into an orbitrap mass analyzer. Ions passed through an orifice and skimmer, a quadrupole ion guide for ion cooling and then entered the quadrupole storage trap. The quadrupole trap has two rod sets; short rods near the exit were biased so that most ions accumulated in this region. Because the orbitrap requires that ions be injected in very short pulses, kilovolt ion extraction potentials were applied to the exit aperture. Flight times of ions to the orbitrap were mass dependent, but for a given mass, ions were injected in bunches less than 100 nanoseconds wide (fwhm).

=== Linear traps and TOF ===
A TOF mass spectrometer can also have a low-duty cycle when coupled with a continuous ion source. Combining an ion trap with a TOF mass analyzer can improve the duty cycle. Both 3D and linear traps have been combined with TOF mass analyzers. A trap can also add MSn capabilities to the system.

=== Linear trap and FTICR ===
Linear traps can be used to improve the performance of FT-ICR (or FTMS) systems. As with 3D ion traps, the duty cycle can be increased to nearly 100% if ions are accumulated in a linear trap, while the FTMS performs other functions. Unwanted ions that can cause space charge problems in the FTMS can be ejected in the linear trap to improve the resolution, sensitivity, and dynamic range of the system, although the system parameters used to optimize such signal characteristics co-vary with one another.

=== Linear trap and triple quadrupole ===
The combination of triple quadrupole MS with LIT technology in the form of an instrument of configuration QqLIT, using axial ejection, is particularly interesting, because this instrument retains the classical triple quadrupole scan functions such as selected reaction monitoring (SRM), product ion (PI), neutral loss (NL) and precursor ion (PC) while also providing access to sensitive ion trap experiments. For small molecules, quantitative and qualitative analysis can be performed using the same instrument.

In addition, for peptide analysis, the enhanced multiply charged (EMC) scan allows an increase in selectivity, while the time-delayed fragmentation (TDF) scan provides additional structural information. In the case of the QqLIT, the uniqueness of the instrument is that the same mass analyzer Q3 can be run in two different modes. This allows very powerful scan combinations when performing information-dependent data acquisition.
