= Molecular fragmentation methods =

Molecular dissociation

Molecular fragmentation (mass spectrometry), or molecular dissociation, occurs both in nature and in experiments. It occurs when a complete molecule is rendered into smaller fragments by some energy source, usually ionizing radiation. The resulting fragments can be far more chemically reactive than the original molecule, as in radiation therapy for cancer, and are thus a useful field of inquiry. Different molecular fragmentation methods have been built to break apart molecules, some of which are listed below.

== Background ==
A major objective of theoretical chemistry and computational chemistry is the calculation of the energy and properties of molecules so that chemical reactivity and material properties can be understood from first principles. As a practical matter, the aim is to complement the knowledge we gain from experiments, particularly where experimental data may be incomplete or very difficult to obtain.

High-level ab-initio quantum chemistry methods are known to be an invaluable tool for understanding the structure, energy, and properties of small up to medium-sized molecules. However, the computational time for these calculations grows rapidly with increased size of molecules. One way of dealing with this problem is the molecular fragmentation approach which provides a hierarchy of approximations to the molecular electronic energy. In this approach, large molecules are divided in a systematic way to small fragments, for which high-level ab-initio calculation can be performed with acceptable computational time.

The defining characteristic of an energy-based molecular fragmentation method is that the molecule (also cluster of molecules, or liquid or solid) is broken up into a set of relatively small molecular fragments, in such a way that the electronic energy, $E_F$, of the full system $F$ is given by a sum of the energies of these fragment molecules:

$E_F = \sum_{i=1}^{N_{frag}}(c_i E_i) + \epsilon_F$

where $E_i$ is the energy of a relatively small molecular fragment,$F_i$. The $c_i$ are simple coefficients (typically integers), and $N_{frag}$ is the number of fragment molecules. Some of the methods also require a correction to the energies evaluated from the fragments. However, where necessary, this correction, $\epsilon_F$, is easily computed.

== Methods ==
Different methods have been devised to fragment molecules. Among them you can find the following energy-based methods:

- Electrostatically Embedded Generalized Molecular Fractionation with Conjugate Caps (EE-GMFCC)
- Generalized Energy-Based Fragmentation (GEBF)
- Molecular Tailoring Approach (MTA)
- Systematic Molecular Fragmentation (SMF)
- Combined Fragmentation Method (CFM)
- Kernel Energy Method (KEM)
- Many-Overlapping-Body (MOB) Expansion
- Generalized Many-Body Expansion (GMBE) Method
