= Amster =

Amster is a surname. Notable people with the surname include:

- I. Jonathan Amster (born 1955), American chemist
- James Amster (1908–1986), American interior decorator
- Mauricio Amster 1907–1980), Ukrainian-born Chilean designer
- Randall Amster (born 1966), American author, activist, and educator
