= Electron-transfer dissociation =

Mass spectrometry method for fragmenting complex macromolecules

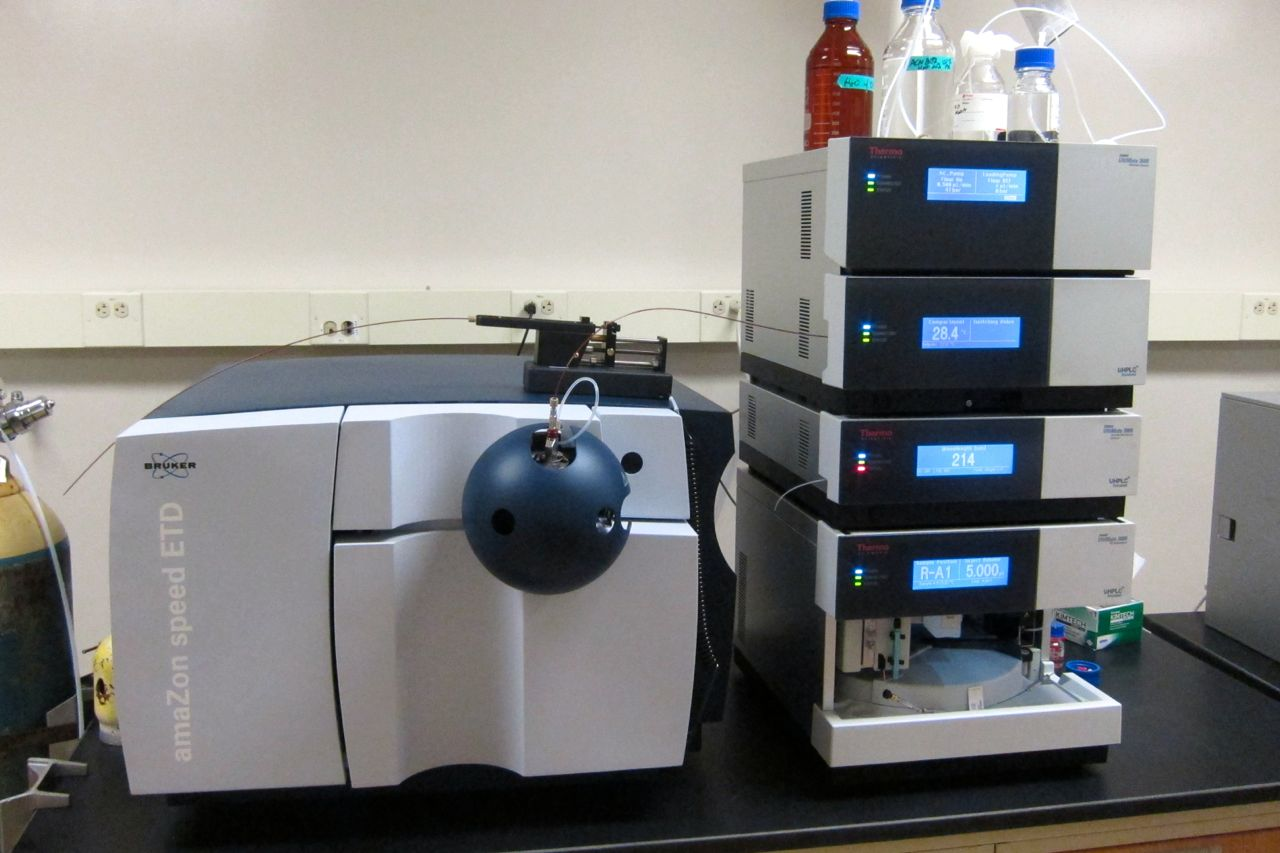
An ion trap mass spectrometer with electron transfer dissociation capability

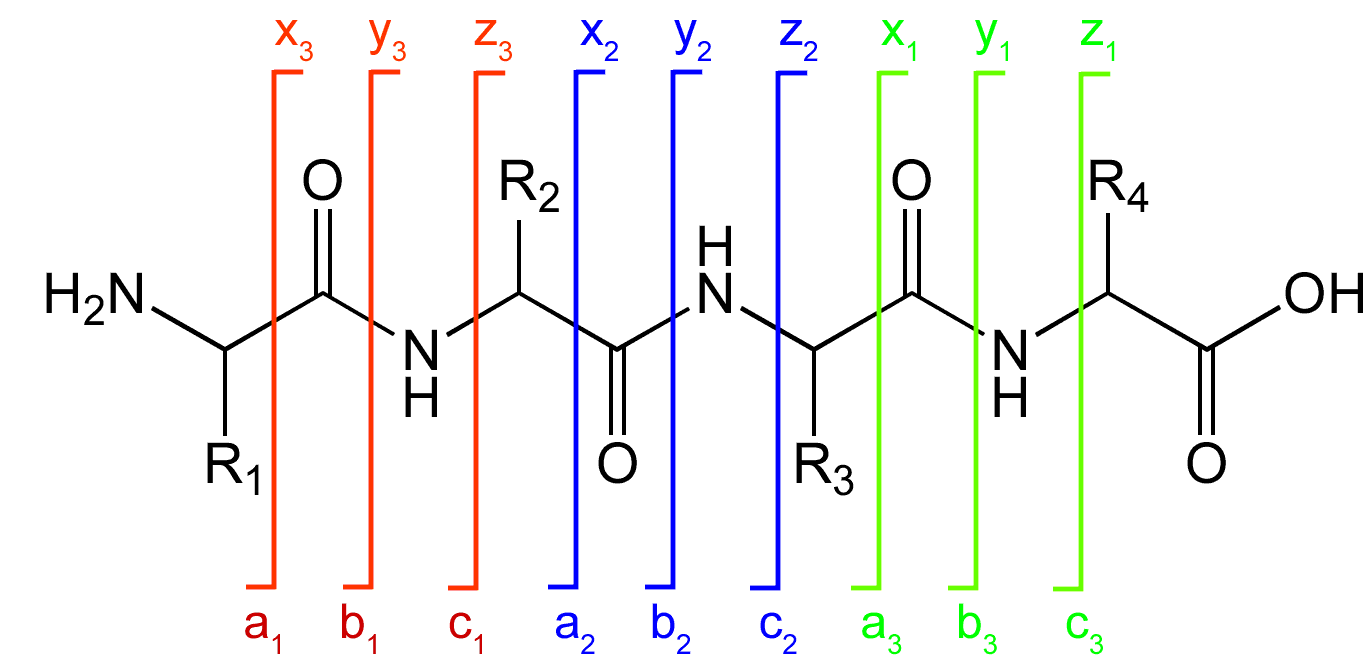
Peptide fragmentation notation

Electron-transfer dissociation (ETD) is a method of fragmenting multiply-charged gaseous macromolecules in a mass spectrometer between the stages of tandem mass spectrometry (MS/MS). Similar to electron-capture dissociation, ETD induces fragmentation of large, multiply-charged cations by transferring electrons to them. ETD is used extensively with polymers and biological molecules such as proteins and peptides for sequence analysis. Transferring an electron causes peptide backbone cleavage into c- and z-ions while leaving labile post translational modifications (PTM) intact. The technique only works well for higher charge state peptide or polymer ions (z>2). However, relative to collision-induced dissociation (CID), ETD is advantageous for the fragmentation of longer peptides or even entire proteins. This makes the technique important for top-down proteomics. The method was developed by Hunt and coworkers at the University of Virginia.

== History ==
Electron-capture dissociation (ECD) was developed in 1998 to fragment large proteins for mass spectrometric analysis. Because ECD requires a large amount of near-thermal electrons (<0.2eV), originally it was used exclusively with Fourier transform ion cyclotron resonance mass spectrometry (FTICR), the most expensive form of MS instrumentation. Less costly options such as quadrupole time-of-flight (Q-TOF), quadrupole ion trap (QIT) and linear quadrupole ion trap (QLT) instruments used the more energy-intensive collision-induced dissociation method (CID), resulting in random fragmentation of peptides and proteins. In 2004 Syka and Coon et al. announced the creation of ETD, a dissociation method similar to ECD, but using a low-cost, widely available commercial spectrometer. The first ETD experiments were run on a QLT mass spectrometer with an electrospray ionization (ESI) source.

== Principle of operation ==
Several steps are involved in electron transfer dissociation. Usually a protein mixture is first separated using high performance liquid chromatography (HPLC). Next multiply-protonated precursor molecules are generated by electrospray ionization and injected into the mass spectrometer. (Only molecules with a charge of 2+ or greater can be used in ETD.) In order for an electron to be transferred to the positive precursor molecules radical anions are generated and put into the ion trap with them. During the ion/ion reaction an electron is transferred to the positively-charged protein or peptide, causing fragmentation along the peptide backbone. Finally the resultant fragments are mass analyzed.

=== Radical anion preparation ===
In the original ETD experiments anthracene (C_{14}H_{10}) was used to generate reactive radical anions through negative chemical ionization. Several polycyclic aromatic hydrocarbon molecules have been used in subsequent experiments, with fluoranthene currently the preferred reagent. Fluoranthene has only about 40% efficiency in electron transfer, however, so other molecules with low electron affinity are being sought.

=== Injection and fragmentation ===
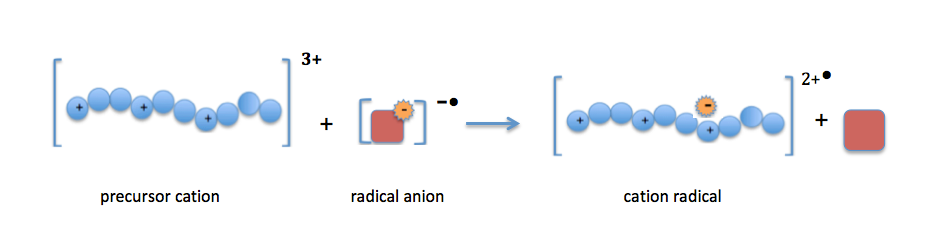
Multiply-charged precursor ion reacts with radical anion

When the precursor cations (proteins or peptides) and radical anions are combined in the ion trap an electron is transferred to the multiply-charged cation. This forms an unstable positive radical cation with one less positive charge and an odd electron. Fragmentation takes place along the peptide backbone at a N− Cα bond, resulting in c- and z-type fragment ions.

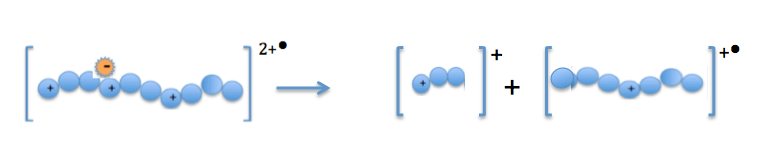
Protein or peptide radical cation fragments into c-ion and z-ion

=== Mass analysis ===
Fragmentation caused by ETD allows more complete protein sequence information to be obtained from ETD spectra than from CID tandem mass spectrometry. Because many peptide backbone c- and z- type ions are detected, almost complete sequence coverage of many peptides can be discerned from ETD fragmentation spectra. Sequences of 15-40 amino acids at both the N-terminus and the C-terminus of the protein can be read using mass-to-charge values for the singly and doubly charged ions. These sequences, together with the measured mass of the intact protein, can be compared to database entries for known proteins and to reveal post-translational modifications.

== Instrumentation ==
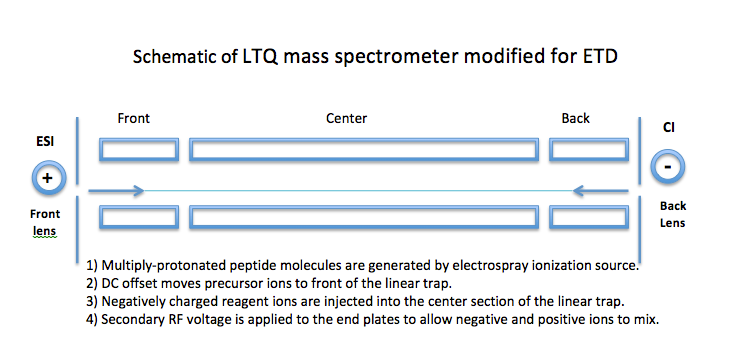
Schematic diagram of LTQ with ETD

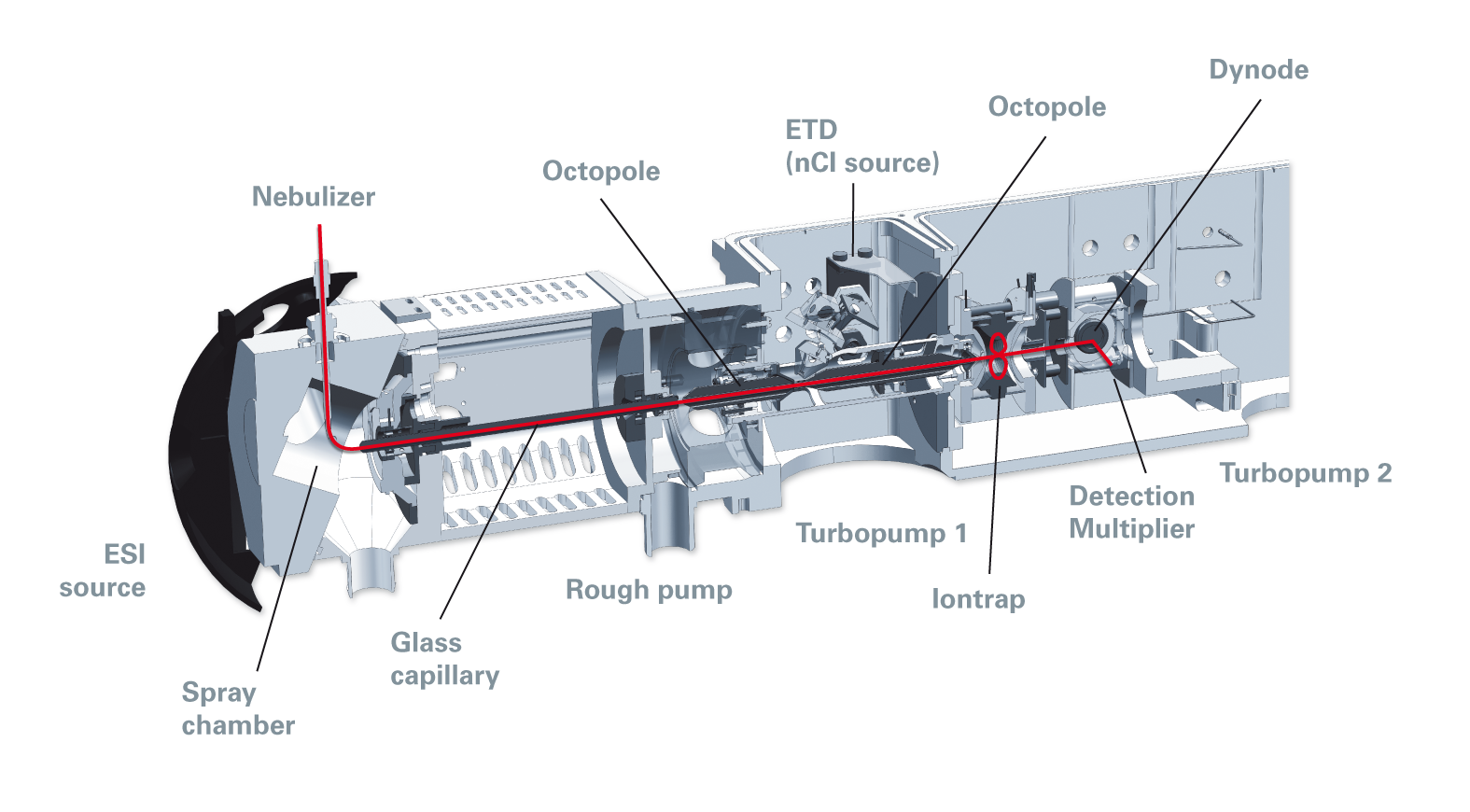
Bruker high capacity ion trap with ETD (schematic diagram)

Electron transfer dissociation takes place in an ion trap mass spectrometer with an electrospray ionization source. The first ETD experiments at the University of Virginia utilized a radio frequency quadrupole linear ion trap (LQT) modified with a chemical ionization (CI) source at the back side of the instrument (see diagram at right). Because a spectrum can be obtained in about 300 milliseconds, liquid chromatography is often coupled with the ETD MS/MS. The disadvantage of using LQT is that the mass resolving power is less than that of other mass spectrometers.

Subsequent studies have tried other instrumentation to improve mass resolution. Having a negative CI source at the back of the instrument interfered with the high-resolution analyzer in LQT-Orbitrap and quadrupole time-of-flight (QTOF), so alternate ionization methods for the radical anions have been introduced.

In 2006 a group at Purdue University led by Scott McLuckey used a quadrupole/time-of-flight (QqTOF) tandem mass spectrometer with pulsed nano-ESI/atmospheric pressure chemical ionization (APCI) dual ionization source using radical anions of 1,3-dinitrobenzene as the electron donor. Later a lab at the University of Wisconsin adapted a hybrid quadrupole linear ion trap-orbitrap mass spectrometer to use ETD. This method also used a front-end ionization method for the radical anions of 9-anthracenecarboxylic acid via pulsed dual ESI sources.

As ETD is increasingly popular for protein and peptide structure analysis, implementation on easily available ion-trap mass spectrometers coupled with high resolution mass analyzers continues to evolve.

== Applications ==
=== Proteomics ===
ETD is widely used in the analysis of protein and large peptides. Important post translational modifications including phosphorylation, glycosylation and disulfide linkages are all analyzed using ETD.

=== Polymer chemistry ===
Although MS-based analyses of polymers have largely been performed using single-stage MS, tandem MS has also been used to characterize polymer components. CID is the most common method of dissociation used, but ETD has been used as a complementary method. Unique bond cleavages resulting from ETD supply valuable diagnostic information.

== See also ==
- Negative electron-transfer dissociation
- Tandem mass spectrometry
- Electrospray
