= Matthias Mann =

German physicist and biochemist (born 1959)

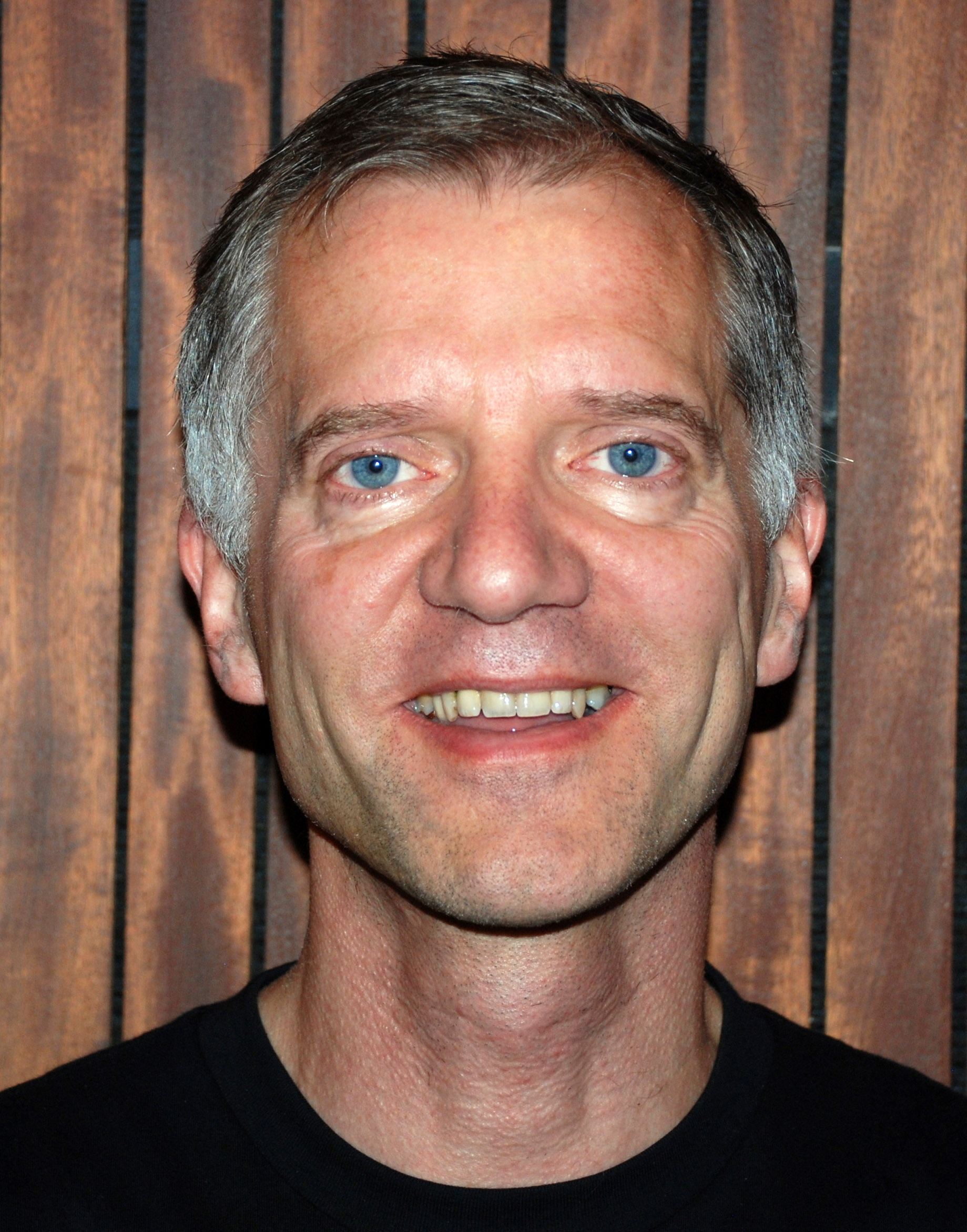
- Mann after a lecture in Zürich 2012
- Born: 10 October 1959 (age 66); Thuine, West Germany
- Citizenship: German
- Education: University of Göttingen (Dipl., 1984); Yale University (Ph.D., 1988)
- Known for: Analytical chemistry; mass spectrometry
- Scientific career
- Fields: Physics; biochemistry
- Doctoral advisor: John Fenn
- Website: www.biochem.mpg.de/en/rd/mann

Matthias Mann (born 10 October 1959) is a German physicist and biochemist. He is doing research in the area of mass spectrometry and proteomics.

== Early life and education ==
Born in Thuine, Lower Saxony, he studied mathematics and physics at the University of Göttingen. He received his Ph.D. in 1988 at Yale University where he worked in the group of John Fenn, who was later awarded the Nobel Prize in Chemistry.

== Career ==
After a postdoctoral fellowship at the University of Southern Denmark in Odense, Mann became group leader at the European Molecular Biology Laboratory (EMBL) in Heidelberg. Later he went back to Odense as a professor of bioinformatics. Since 2005 he has been a director at the Max Planck Institute of Biochemistry in Martinsried near Munich. In addition, he became a principal investigator at the Novo Nordisk Foundation Center for Protein Research in Copenhagen.

From his research group in Martinsried originated in 2016 PreOmics, a company commercializing sample prep sets, and EVOSEP, a company commercializing protein analysis equipment.

His work has impact in various fields of mass spectrometry-based proteomics:

- The peptide sequence tag approach developed at the EMBL was one of the first methods for the identification of peptides based on mass spectra and genome data.
- Nano-electrospray (an electrospray technique with very low flow rates) was the first method that allowed femtomole sequencing of proteins from polyacrylamide gels.
- A recently developed metabolic labeling technique called SILAC (stable isotope labeling with amino acids in cell culture) is widely used in quantitative proteomics.

== Other activities ==
- PharmaFluidics, Member of the Advisory Board (since 2019)

== Awards and honors ==
- 1991: Malcom Award by the journal Organic Mass Spectrometry
- 1996: Mattauch Herzog Prize in Mass Spectrometry
- 1997: Hewlett-Packard Prize for Strategic Research in Automation of Sample Preparation
- 1998: Edman Prize by the "Methods in Protein Structure Analysis" Society
- 1999: Bieman Medal for Outstanding Achievement in Mass Spectrometry (American Society for Mass Spectrometry)
- 1999: Named second most cited scientist in chemistry in the years 1994 to 1996 by the Institute of Scientific Information
- 1999: Elected visiting professor Harvard Medical School
- 1999: Elected to the European Molecular Biology Organization (EMBO)
- 2000: Meyenburg Prize
- 2001: Bernhard and Matha Rasmussens Memorial award in Cancer Research
- 2001: Meyenburg Cancer Research Award given by the German Cancer Research Center
- 2001: Fresenius Prize and Medal for Analytical Chemistry given by the German Chemical Society
- 2004: Honorary Doctorate, University of Utrecht, Netherlands
- 2004: Lundbeck Prize
- 2004: Novo-Nordisk Prize
- 2005: Anfinsen Award of the Protein Society
- 2006: "Biochemical Analysis" prize by the German Society for Clinical Chemistry and Laboratory Medicine
- 2008: HUPO Distinguished Achievement Award in Proteomic Science
- 2008: Bijvoet Medal of the Bijvoet Center for Biomolecular Research of Utrecht University
- 2010: Friedrich Wilhelm Joseph von Schelling-Prize by the Bavarian Academy of Sciences and Humanities
- 2012: Gottfried Wilhelm Leibniz Prize by German Research Foundation
- 2012: Feodor Lynen Medal
- 2012: Körber European Science Prize
- 2012: Louis-Jeantet Prize for Medicine
- 2012: Ernst Schering Prize
- 2015: Theodor Bücher Lecture and Medal
- 2015: Danish Order of Dannebrog Knights Cross
- 2015: Barry L. Karger Medal in Bioanalytical Chemistry
- 2017: Lennart Philipson Award
- 2023: German Society for Biochemistry and Molecular Biology’s Otto Warburg Medal
- 2026: Canada Gairdner International Award
