= Peptide sequence tag =

A peptide sequence tag is a piece of information about a peptide obtained by tandem mass spectrometry that can be used to identify this peptide in a protein database.

== Mass spectrometry ==
In general, peptides can be identified by fragmenting them in a mass spectrometer. For example, during collision-induced dissociation peptides collide with a gas within the mass spectrometer and break into pieces at their peptide bonds. The resulting fragment ions (called b-ions and y-ions) have mass differences corresponding to the residue masses of the respective amino acids. Thus, a tandem mass spectrum contains partial information about the amino acid sequence of the peptide. The peptide sequence tag approach, developed by Matthias Wilm and Matthias Mann at the EMBL, uses this information to identify the peptide in a database. Briefly, a couple of masses are extracted from the spectrum in order to obtain the peptide sequence tag. This peptide sequence tag is a unique identifier of a specific peptide and can be used to find it in a database containing all possible peptide sequences.

== Peptide fragment notation ==
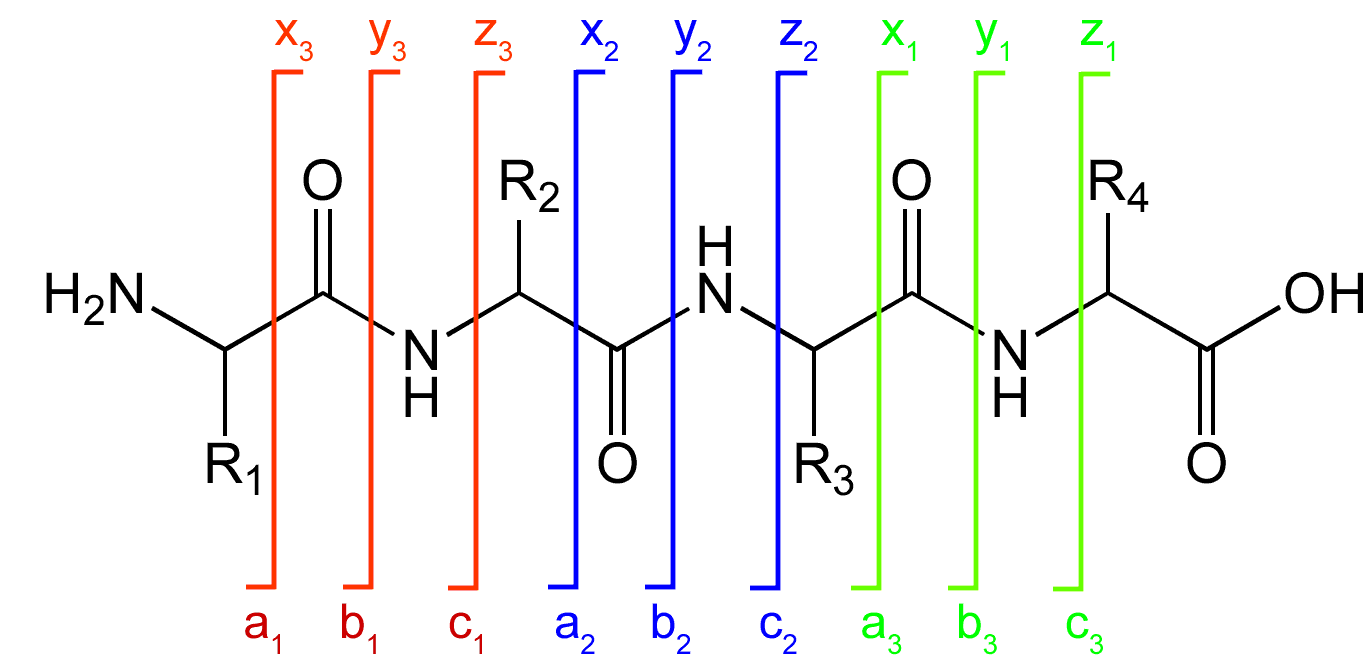
Peptide fragmentation notation using the scheme of Roepstorff and Fohlman (1984).

A notation has been developed for indicating peptide fragments that arise from a tandem mass spectrum. Peptide fragment ions are indicated by a, b, or c if the charge is retained on the N-terminus and by x, y or z if the charge is maintained on the C-terminus. The subscript indicates the number of amino acid residues in the fragment. Prime symbols indicate the number of protons or hydrogens added to the fragment to form the observed ion. For example, y'' denotes the singly charged ion analogous to a protonated peptide, (y''')^{2+} is a doubly charged ion analogous to a doubly protonated peptide.

== See also ==
- Protein sequence
- Protein mass spectrometry
