= Infrared photodissociation spectroscopy =

Infrared photodissociation–mass spectrometry
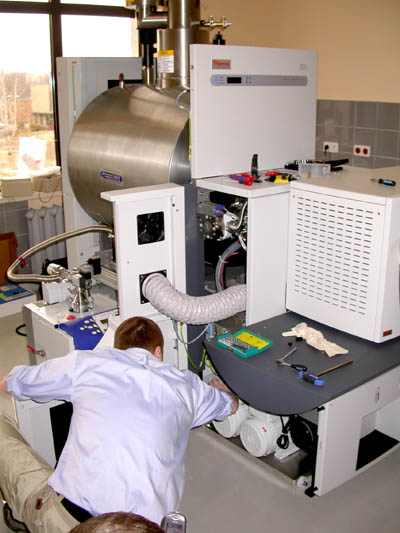
- FT-ICR system
- Acronym: IRPD
- Classification: Infrared Spectroscopy; Mass spectrometry
- Analytes: ion clusters organic molecules biomolecules

Other techniques
- Related: Spectroscopy

Infrared photodissociation (IRPD) spectroscopy uses infrared radiation to break bonds in, often ionic, molecules (photodissociation), within a mass spectrometer. In combination with post-ionization, this technique can also be used for neutral species. IRPD spectroscopy has been shown to use electron ionization, corona discharge, and electrospray ionization to obtain spectra of volatile and nonvolatile compounds. Ionized gases trapped in a mass spectrometer can be studied without the need of a solvent as in infrared spectroscopy.

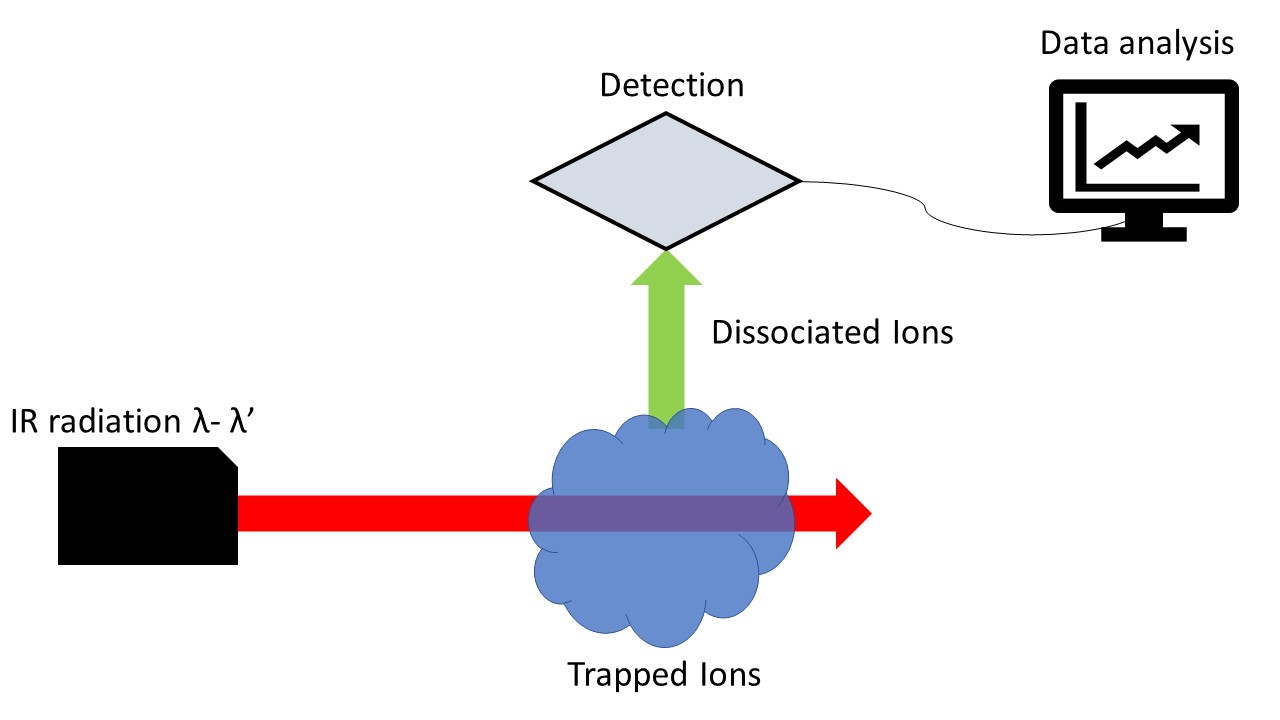
Schematic diagram of infrared photodissociation spectrometer

== History ==
Scientists began to wonder about the energetic of cluster formation early in the 19th century. Henry Eyring developed the activated-complex theory describing kinetics of reactions. Interest in studying the weak interactions of molecules and ions(e.g. van der Waals) in clusters encouraged gas phase spectroscopy, in 1962 D.H. Rank studied weak interactions in the gas phase using traditional infrared spectroscopy. D.S. Bomse used IRPD with an ICR to study isotopic compounds in 1980 at California Institute of Technology. Spectroscopy for weak bonding clusters was limited by low cluster concentration and the variety of accessible cluster states. Cluster states vary in part due to frequent collisions with other species, to reduce collisions in gas phase IRPD forms clusters in low pressure ion traps (e.g. FT-ICR). Nitrogen and water were one of the first complexes studied with the aid of a mass spectrometer by A. Good at University of Alberta in the 1960s.

== Instrumentation ==
Photodissociation is used to detect electromagnetic activity of ions, compounds, and clusters when spectroscopy cannot be directly applied. Low concentration of analyte is usually the critical and inhibiting factor to measure absorption in the gas phase. Mass spectrometers, e.g., time-of-flight and ion cyclotron resonance, have been used to study hydrated ion clusters. Instruments are able to use ESI to effectively form hydrated ion clusters. Laser ablation and corona discharge have also been used to form ion clusters. Complexes are directed through a mass spectrometer where they are irradiated with infrared light, Nd:YAG laser.

== Application ==
Infrared photodissociation spectroscopy maintains a powerful capability to study bond energies of coordination complexes. IRPD can measure varying bond energies of compounds, including dative bonds and coordination energies of molecular clusters. Structural information about analytes can acquired by using mass selectivity and interpreting fragmentation. The spectroscopic information usually resembles that of linear infrared spectra and can be used to obtain detailed structural information of gas-phase species, in case of metal complexes, insights into ligand coordination, bond activations and successive reactions can be obtained.
