= McLafferty rearrangement =

Chemical reaction

The McLafferty rearrangement is a fragmentation reaction observed in mass spectrometry of organic molecules in which the parent radical cation splits into daughter radical cation and neutral spin-paired molecule. It is sometimes found that a molecule containing a keto-group undergoes β-cleavage, with the gain of the γ-hydrogen atom, as first reported by Anthony Nicholson working in the Division of Chemical Physics at the CSIRO in Australia. This rearrangement is a retro-ene reaction, and a member of the sigmatropic family of reactions.

The products of the McLafferty rearrangement are an alkene whose length depends on the size of the parent ketone's carbon chain, and a radical enol cation.

== The reaction ==
A description of the reaction was later published by the American chemist Fred McLafferty in 1959 leading to his name being associated with the process.

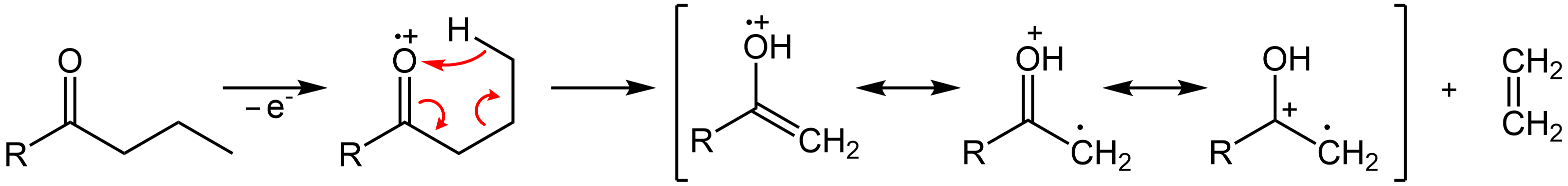

== See also ==
- The Type II Norrish reaction is the equivalent photochemical process
- α-cleavage
