= Electron-capture dissociation =

Method in mass spectrometry

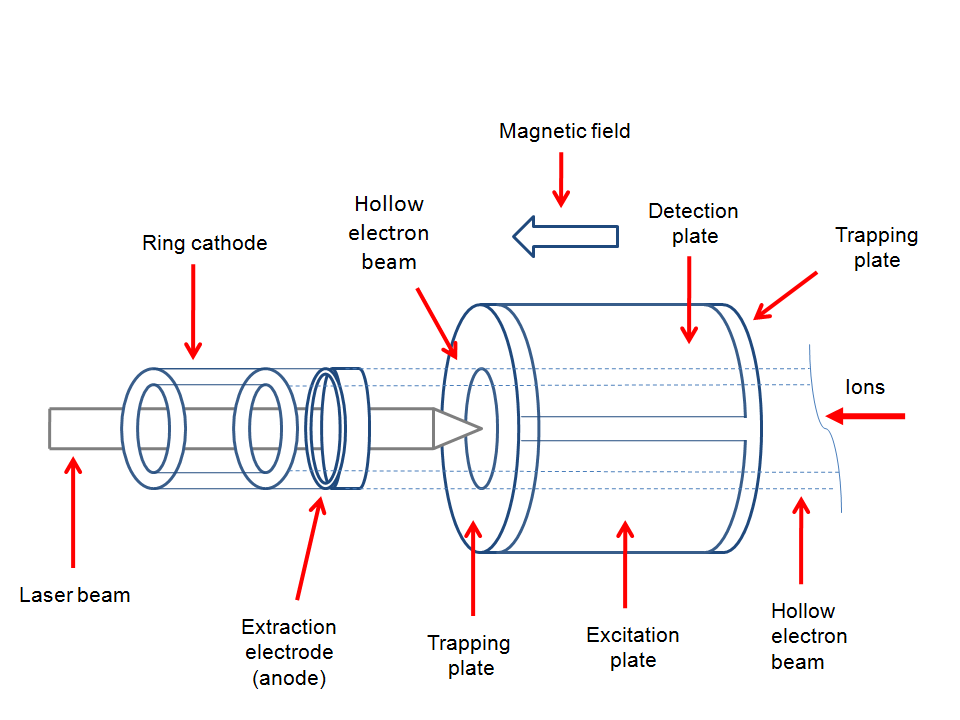
Schematic diagram of the combined ECD FTICRMS and IRMPD experimental setup

Electron-capture dissociation (ECD) is a method of fragmenting gas-phase ions for structure elucidation of peptides and proteins in tandem mass spectrometry. It is one of the most widely used techniques for activation and dissociation of mass selected precursor ion in MS/MS. It involves the direct introduction of low-energy electrons to trapped gas-phase ions.

== History ==
Electron-capture dissociation was developed by Roman Zubarev and Neil Kelleher while in Fred McLafferty's lab at Cornell University. Irradiation of melittin 4+ ions and ubiquitin 10+ ions (trapped in FT-MS cell) by laser pulses not only resulted in peculiar c', z fragmentation but also charge reduction. It was suggested that if FT cell is modified to trap cations and electrons simultaneously, secondary electrons emitted by UV photons increases the charge reduction effect and c′, z• fragmentation. Replacing UV laser with EI source led to the development of this new technique.

== Principles ==
Electron-capture dissociation typically involves a multiply protonated molecule M interacting with a free electron to form an odd-electron ion. Liberation of the electric potential energy results in fragmentation of the product ion.

$$[\ce{M} + n\ce{H}]^{n+} + \ce{e^- ->} \bigg[ [\ce{M} + n\ce{H}]^{(n-1)+} \bigg]^* \ce{-> fragments}$$.

Rate of electron capture dissociation not only depends on the frequency of ion–electron fragmentation reactions but also on the number of ions in an ion–electron interaction volume. Electron current density and cross-section of ECD is directly proportional to fragmentation frequency. An indirectly heated dispenser cathode used as an electron source results in larger electron current and larger emitting surface area.

$$\text{Efficiency of ECD MS/MS} = \frac{\text{Total number(abundance) of fragment ions}}{\text{Total number (abundance) of precursor ions}}$$

ECD devices can be of two forms. It can trap analyte ions during the ECD stage or can undergo flow through mode where dissociation takes place as analyte ions flows continuously through the ECD region. Flow through mode has advantage over other mode because nearly all the analyte ion beam is used. However, that decreases the efficiency of ECD for flow through mode.

ECD produces significantly different types of fragment ions (although primarily c- and z-type, b-ions have been identified in ECD) than other MS/MS fragmentation methods such as electron-detachment dissociation (EDD) (primarily a and x types), collision-induced dissociation (CID) (primarily b and y type) and infrared multiphoton dissociation. CID and IRMPD introduce internal vibrational energy in some way or another, causing loss of post-translational modifications during fragmentation. In ECD, unique fragments (and complementary to CID) are observed, and the ability to fragment whole macromolecules effectively has been promising.

Although ECD is primarily used in Fourier transform ion cyclotron resonance mass spectrometry, investigators have indicated that it has been successfully used in an ion-trap mass spectrometer. ECD can also do rapid integration of multiple scans in FTICR-MS if put in a combination with external accumulation.

ECD is a recently introduced MS/MS fragmentation technique and is still being investigated. The mechanism of ECD is still under debate but appears not to necessarily break the weakest bond and is therefore thought to be a fast process (nonergodic) where energy is not free to relax intramolecularly. Suggestions have been made that radical reactions initiated by the electron may be responsible for the action of ECD. In a similar MS/MS fragmentation technique called electron-transfer dissociation, the electrons are transferred by collision between the analyte cations and reagent anions.

== Applications ==
=== Disulfide bond cleavage ===
ECD itself and combined with other MS is very useful for proteins and peptides containing multiple disulfide bonds. FTICR combined with ECD helps to recognize peptides containing disulfide bonds. ECD could also access important sequence information by activation of higher charged proteins. Moreover, disulfide bond cleavage takes place by ECD of multiply charge proteins or peptides produced by ESI. Electron capture by these proteins releases H atom, captured by the disulfide bond to cause its dissociation.

$$\ce{RS-SR' + \bullet H -> R-S(H) \bullet S-R' -> RSH{} + \bullet SR'}$$

ECD with UV-based activation increases the top-down MS sequence coverage of disulfide bond containing proteins and cleaves a disulfide bond homolytically to produce two separated thiol radicals. This technique was observed with insulin and ribonuclease, which led them to cleave up to three disulfide bonds and increase the sequence coverage.

=== Post-translational modifications ===
ECD-MS fragments can retain posttranslational modifications such as carboxylation, phosphorylation and O-glycosylation. ECD has the potential to do the top-down characterization of the major types of posttranslational modifications in proteins. It successfully cleaved 87 of 208 backbone bonds and provided the first direct characterization of a phosphoprotein, bovine β casein, simultaneously restricting the location of five phosphorylation sites. It has advantages over CAD to measure the degree of phosphorylation with a minimum number of losses of phosphates and for phosphopeptide/phosphoprotein mapping, which makes ECD a superior technique.

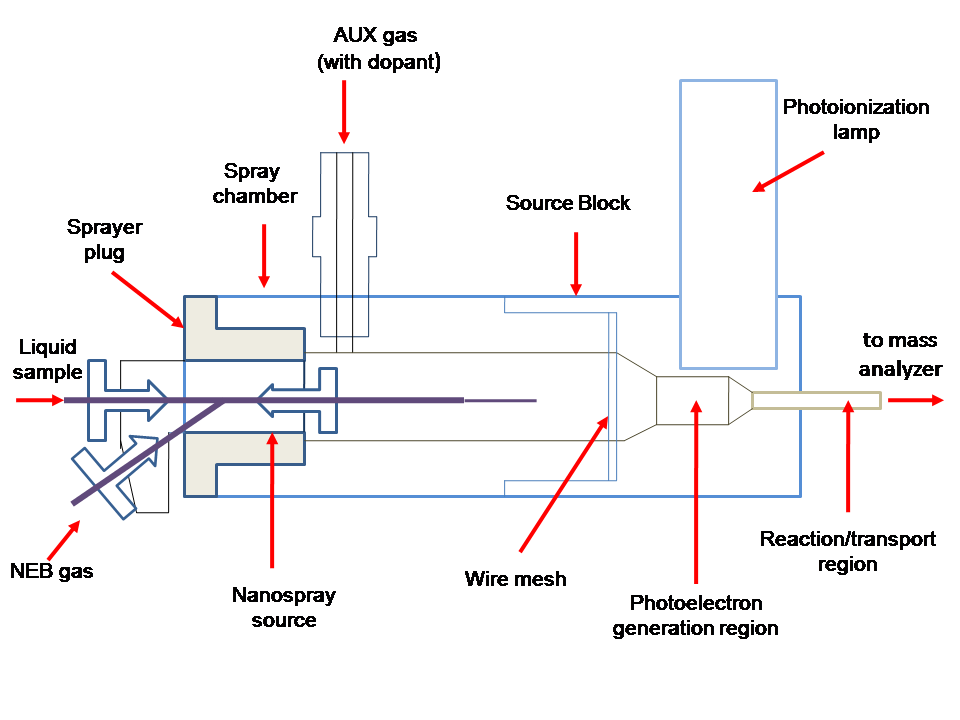
Schematic diagram of Atmospheric pressure electron capture dissociation (AP-ECD) source

=== Coupling of ECD with separation techniques ===
ECD has been coupled with capillary electrophoresis (CE) to gain insight into structural analysis of mixture of peptides and protein digest. Micro-HPLC combined with ECD FTICR was used to analyze pepsin digest of cytochrome c. Sequence tags were provided by analysis of a mixture of peptides and tryptic digest of bovine serum albumin when LC ECD FTICR MS was used. Additionally, LC-ECD-MS/MS is provides longer sequence tags than LC-CID-MS/MS for identification of proteins. ECD devices using radio frequency quadrupole ion trap are relevant for high-throughput proteomics. Recently, Atmospheric pressure electron capture dissociation (AP-ECD) is emerging as a better technique because it can be implemented as a stand-alone ion-source device and doesn't require any modification of the main instrument.

=== Proteomics ===
Analysis of proteins can be done by either using top-down or bottom-up approach. However, better sequence coverage is provided by top-down analysis. Combination of ECD with FTICR MS has resulted in popularity of this approach. It has also helped in determining the multiple modification sites in intact proteins. Native electron capture dissociation (NECD) was used to study cytochrome c dimer and has been recently used to elucidate iron-binding channels in horse spleen ferritin.

=== Synthetic polymers ===
ECD studies of polyalkene glycols, polyamides, polyacrylates and polyesters are useful for understanding composition of polymer samples. It has become a powerful technique to analyze structural information about precursor ions during MS/MS for synthetic polymers. ECD's single bond cleavage tendency makes the interpretation of product ion scans simple and easy for polymer chemistry.

== See also ==
- Electron capture ionization
- Electron–capture mass spectrometry
- RRKM theory
