= I. Jonathan Amster =

American chemist

- Born: Ives Jonathan Amster; 1955
- Citizenship: United States
- Education: Cornell University; University of California, Irvine
- Scientific career
- Fields: Chemistry
- Institutions: Franklin College of Arts and Sciences of the University of Georgia.
- Doctoral advisor: Robert T. Mciver

Ives Jonathan Amster (born 1955) is an American chemist. He is a professor and head of the department of chemistry in the Franklin College of Arts and Sciences of the University of Georgia. His research focuses upon the use of mass spectrometry in analytical and biological chemistry. He was named a Fellow of the American Association for the Advancement of Science in 2010, "for distinguished contributions to the fields of analytical chemistry and mass spectrometry".

== Education ==
At Cornell University, Amster completed a bachelor of arts in 1977, master of science in 1983, and doctor of philosophy in 1986. His doctoral advisor was Fred McLafferty. After completing his Ph.D., he did postdoctoral research at the University of California, Irvine with Robert T. McIver.
