= Inductive cleavage =

Inductive cleavage, in organic chemistry, is the charge-initiated counterpoint to radical initiated alpha-cleavage. Since inductive cleavage does not require unpairing and re-pairing electrons it can occur at both radical cationic and cationic sites.

== Mass spectrometry ==
Generally this topic is discussed when covering mass spectrometry and occurs generally by the same mechanisms.

To neutralize the positive charge on the ionization site a single two-electron transfer must be made. Neutralization of the positive charge at the ionization site is performed at the expense of the atom adjacent to the ionization site, transferring the positive charge to this atom as a result of the bond cleavage.
