= Fred McLafferty =

American chemist (1923–2021)

Fred W. McLafferty
- Born: May 11, 1923; Evanston, Illinois, U.S.
- Died: December 26, 2021 (aged 98); Ithaca, New York, U.S.
- Education: University of Nebraska (BS, 1943 MS, 1947); Cornell University (PhD, 1950); University of Iowa (PostDoc)
- Known for: Gas chromatography–mass spectrometry Electron-capture dissociation McLafferty rearrangement
- Awards: ACS Award in Chemical Instrumentation (1971); Fisher Award (1981); Member of the National Academy of Sciences (1982); William H. Nichols Medal (1984); Oesper Award (1985); Sir J.J. Thomson Gold Medal (1985); Field and Franklin Award (1989); ASMS Distinguished Contribution in Mass Spectrometry Award (2003); Lavoisier Medal (2004)
- Scientific career
- Fields: Chemist
- Workplaces: Purdue University; Cornell University
- Doctoral students: I. Jonathan Amster; Neil Kelleher

External videos
- “A Conversation with Fred W. McLafferty”, Cornell University, 2006, 90 minute video

Fred Warren McLafferty (May 11, 1923 − December 26, 2021) was an American chemist known for his work in mass spectrometry. He is best known for the McLafferty rearrangement reaction that was observed with mass spectrometry. With Roland Gohlke, he pioneered the technique of gas chromatography–mass spectrometry. He is also known for electron-capture dissociation, a method of fragmenting gas-phase ions.

== Early life and education ==
Fred McLafferty was born in Evanston, Illinois in 1923, but attended grade school in Omaha, Nebraska, graduating from Omaha North High School in 1940. The urgent requirements of World War II accelerated his undergraduate studies at the University of Nebraska; he obtained his B.S. degree in 1943 and thereafter entered the US armed forces. He served in western Europe during the invasion of Germany and was awarded the Combat Infantryman Badge, a Purple Heart, five Bronze Star Medals and a Presidential Unit Citation.

He returned to the University of Nebraska in late 1945 and completed his M.S. degree in 1947. He went on to work under William Miller at Cornell University where he earned his Ph.D. in 1950. He went on to a postdoctoral researcher position at the University of Iowa with R.L. Shriner.

== Dow Chemical ==
He took a position at Dow Chemical in Midland, Michigan in 1950 and was in charge of mass spectrometry and gas chromatography from 1950 to 1956. In 1953–1956, he started collecting reference mass spectra whenever the instruments were not in use.

In 1956, he became the Director of Dow's Eastern Research Lab in Framingham, Massachusetts. During this time, he developed the first GC-MS instruments and analyzed the company's reference collection of spectra he himself founded. This allowed him to work out techniques for determining the structure of organic molecules by mass spectrometry, most notably in the discovery of what is now known as the McLafferty rearrangement.

== Academic career ==
From 1964 to 1968, he was Professor of Chemistry at Purdue University. In 1968, he returned to his alma mater, Cornell University, to become the Peter J. W. Debye Professor of Chemistry. He was elected to the United States National Academy of Sciences in 1982. While at Cornell, McLafferty assembled one of the first comprehensive databases of mass spectra and pioneered artificial intelligence techniques to interpret GC-MS results. His PBM STIRS program has widespread use to save hours of time-consuming work otherwise required to manually analyze GC-MS results.

== Personal life and death ==
McLafferty died in Ithaca, New York, on December 26, 2021, at the age of 98.

== Honors and awards ==
- 1971 ACS Award in Chemical Instrumentation
- 1981 ACS Award in Analytical Chemistry
- 1984 William H. Nichols Medal
- 1985 Oesper Award
- 1985 J. J. Thomson Gold Medal by International Mass Spectrometry Society
- 1987 Pittsburgh Analytical Chemistry Award
- 1989 Field and Franklin Award for Mass Spectrometry
- 1989 University of Naples Gold Medal
- 1992 Robert Boyle Gold Medal by the Royal Society of Chemistry
- 1996 Chemical Pioneer Award from the American Institute of Chemists
- 1997 Bijvoet Medal of the Bijvoet Center for Biomolecular Research.
- 1999 J. Heyrovsky Medal by the Czech Academy of Sciences
- 2000 G. Natta Gold Medal by Italian Chemical Society
- 2001 Torbern Bergman Medal by the Swedish Chemical Society
- 2003 John B. Fenn Distinguished Contribution in Mass Spectrometry by the American Society for Mass Spectrometry (ASMS)
- 2004 Lavoisier Medal by the French Chemical Society
- 2006 Pehr Edman Award by the International Association for Protein Structure
- 2015 Nakanishi Prize from the American Chemical Society
- 2019 American Chemical Society designated a National Historic Chemical Landmark in Midland, MI for the demonstration of the first operating GC-MS by Fred McLafferty and Roland Gohlke.

== Bibliography ==
- Venkataraghavan, Rengachari; McLafferty, Fred W. (1982). Mass spectral correlations. Columbus, OH: American Chemical Society. ISBN 978-0-8412-0702-8.
- Heller, Stephen R.; McLafferty, Fred W.; Stauffer, Douglas B.; Stenhagen, Einar (1989). The Wiley/NBS registry of mass spectral data. New York: Wiley. ISBN 978-0-471-62886-6.
- Stauffer, Douglas B.; McLafferty, Fred W. (1991). The important peak index of the registry of mass spectral data. New York: Wiley. ISBN 978-0-471-55270-3.
- Tureček, František; McLafferty, Fred W. (1993). Interpretation of mass spectra. Sausalito, Calif: University Science Books. ISBN 978-0-935702-25-5.
