= Proteoform =

Different forms of a protein

Proteoforms are the different forms of a protein produced from the genome with a variety of sequence variations, splice isoforms, and post-translational modifications. Proteoform captures the disparate sources of biological variation which alter primary sequence and composition at the whole-protein level. Protein characterization at the proteoform level has a crucial importance to fully understand biological processes since specific proteoforms can carry particular biological functions. The proteoforms estimation in human can be in millions for around 20,000 proteins.
