= Collision-induced dissociation =

Mass spectrometry technique to induce fragmentation of selected ions in the gas phase

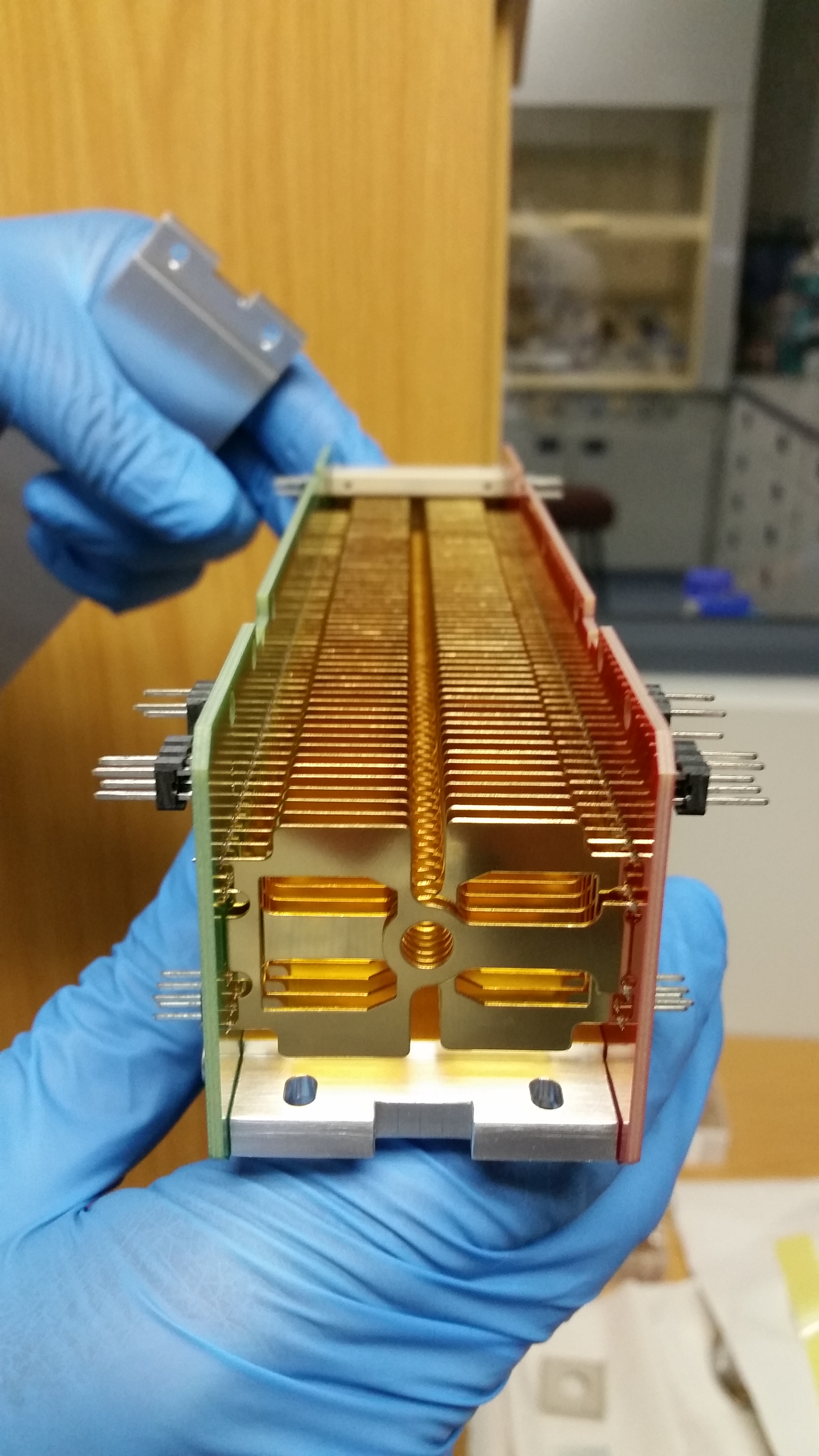
Collision cell from a Waters Xevo TQ-S triple quadrupole mass spectrometer.

Collision-induced dissociation (CID), also known as collisionally activated dissociation (CAD), is a mass spectrometry technique to induce fragmentation of selected ions in the gas phase. The selected ions (typically molecular ions or protonated molecules) are usually accelerated by applying an electrical potential to increase the ion kinetic energy and then allowed to collide with neutral molecules (often helium, nitrogen, or argon). In the collision, some of the kinetic energy is converted into internal energy which results in bond breakage and the fragmentation of the molecular ion into smaller fragments. These fragment ions can then be analyzed by tandem mass spectrometry.

CID and the fragment ions produced by CID are used for several purposes. Partial or complete structural determination can be achieved. In some cases, identity can be established based on previous knowledge without determining structure. Another use is in simply achieving more sensitive and specific detection. By detecting a unique fragment ion, the precursor ion can be detected in the presence of other ions of the same m/z value (mass-to-charge ratio), reducing the background and increasing the limit of detection.

== Low-energy CID and high-energy CID ==
Low-energy CID is typically carried out with ion kinetic energies less than approximately 1 kiloelectron volt (1 keV). Low-energy CID is highly efficient in fragmenting the selected precursor ions, but the type of fragment ions observed in low-energy CID is strongly dependent on the ion kinetic energy. Very low collision energies favor ion structure rearrangement, and the probability of direct bond cleavage increases as ion kinetic energy increases, leading to higher ion internal energies. High-energy CID (HECID) is carried out in magnetic sector mass spectrometers or tandem magnetic sector mass spectrometers and in tandem time-of-flight mass spectrometers (TOF/TOF). High-energy CID involves ion kinetic energies in the kilovolt range (typically 1 keV to 20 keV). High-energy CID can produce some types of fragment ions that are not formed in low-energy CID, such as charge-remote fragmentation in molecules with hydrocarbon substructures or sidechain fragmentation in peptides.

== Triple quadrupole mass spectrometers ==
In a triple quadrupole mass spectrometer there are three quadrupoles. The first quadrupole termed "Q1" can act as a mass filter and transmits a selected ion and accelerates it towards "Q2" which is termed a collision cell. The pressure in Q2 is higher and the ions collides with neutral gas in the collision cell and are fragmented by CID. The fragments are then accelerated out of the collision cell and enter Q3 which scans through the mass range, analyzing the resulting fragments (as they hit a detector). This produces a mass spectrum of the CID fragments from which structural information or identity can be gained. Many other experiments using CID on a triple quadrupole exist such as precursor ion scans that determine where a specific fragment came from rather than what fragments are produced by a given molecule.

== Fourier transform ion cyclotron resonance ==
Ions trapped in the ICR cell can be excited by applying pulsed electric fields at their resonant frequency to increase their kinetic energy. The duration and amplitude of the pulse determines the ion kinetic energy. Because a collision gas present at low pressure requires a long time for excited ions to collide with neutral molecules, a pulsed valve can be used to introduce a short burst of collision gas. Trapped fragment ions or their ion-molecule reaction products can be re-excited for multistage mass spectrometry (MS^{n}). If the excitation is not applied on the resonant frequency, but at a slightly off-resonant frequency, the ions will alternately be excited and de-excited, permitting multiple collisions at low collision energy. Sustained off-resonance irradiation collision-induced dissociation (SORI-CID) is a CID technique used in Fourier transform ion cyclotron resonance mass spectrometry which involves accelerating the ions in cyclotron motion (in a circle inside of an ion trap) in the presence of a collision gas.

== Higher-energy collisional dissociation ==
Higher-energy collisional dissociation (HCD) is a CID technique specific to the orbitrap mass spectrometer in which fragmentation takes place external to the trap. HCD was formerly known as higher-energy C-trap dissociation. In HCD, the ions pass through the C-trap and into the HCD cell, an added multipole collision cell, where dissociation takes place. The ions are then returned to the C-trap before injection into the orbitrap for mass analysis. HCD does not suffer from the low mass cutoff of resonant-excitation (CID) and therefore is useful for isobaric tag–based quantification as reporter ions can be observed. Despite the name, the collision energy of HCD is typically in the regime of low energy collision induced dissociation (less than 100 eV).

== Fragmentation mechanisms ==
Homolytic fragmentation

Homolytic fragmentation is bond dissociation where each of the fragments retains one of the originally-bonded electrons.

Heterolytic fragmentation

Heterolytic fragmentation is bond cleavage where the bonding electrons remain with only one of the fragment species.

In CID, charge remote fragmentation is a type of covalent bond breaking that occurs in a gas phase ion in which the cleaved bond is not adjacent to the location of the charge. This fragmentation can be observed using tandem mass spectrometry.

== See also ==
- Electron-capture dissociation (ECD)
- Electron-transfer dissociation (ETD)
- Infrared multiphoton dissociation (IRMPD)
