= International Tech Park, Bengaluru =

Indian technology park

Coordinates: 12°59′8.29″N 77°44′9.18″E

International Tech Park
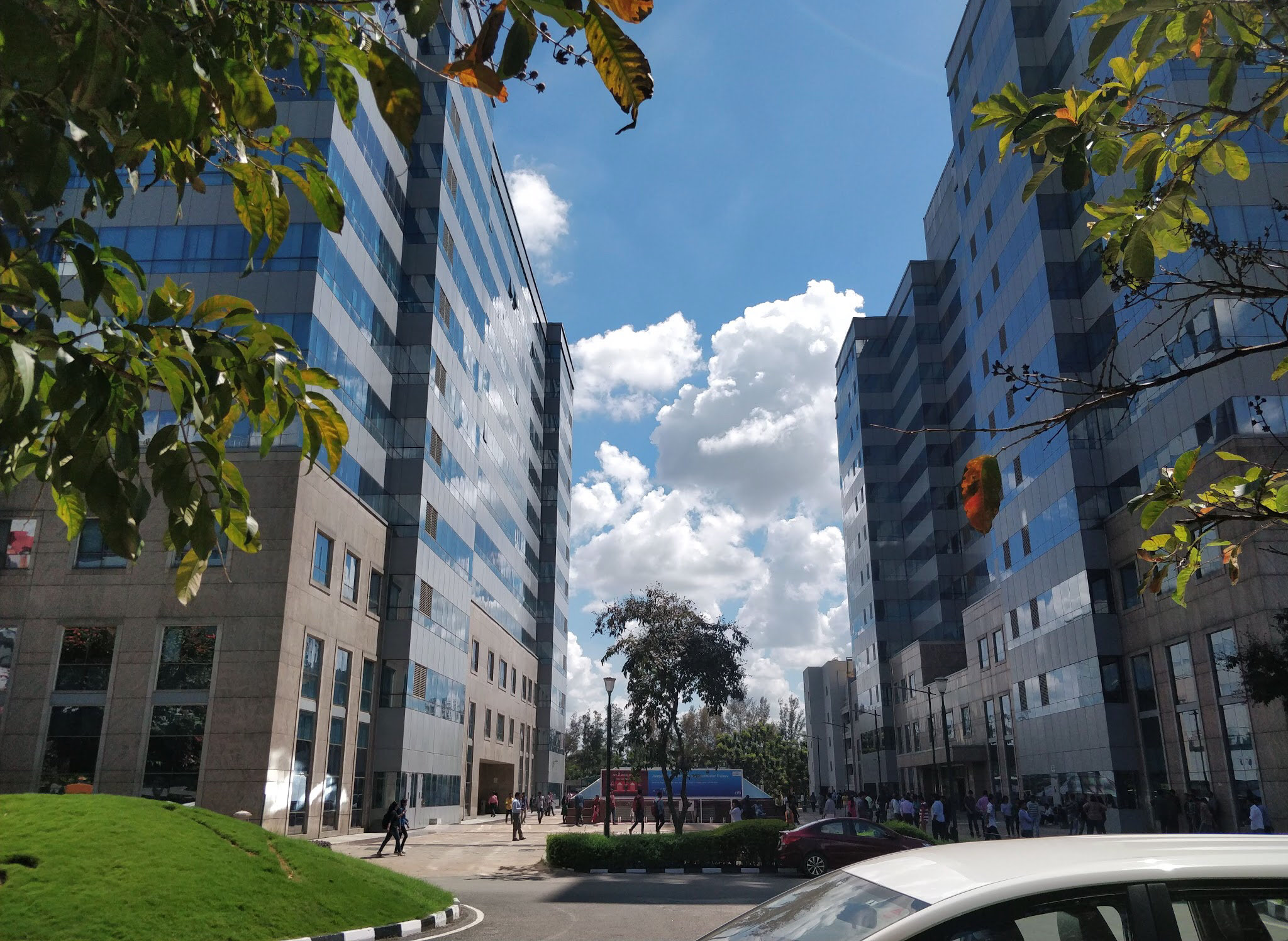
- The ITPL in Whitefield, Bangalore
- Type: Government owned
- Industry: Information Technology Business Park
- Genre: Infrastructure Service Provider
- Founded: January 1994; 32 years ago
- Headquarters: Whitefield, Bangalore, India

International Tech Park commonly called ITPL or ITPB is a tech park located in Whitefield, Bangalore, 18 km from the city centre. The Park was designed by Singaporean architectural firm, RSP Architects Planners & Engineers and is now managed by Capitaland. It includes the 450,000 square foot Park Square Mall, several sporting arenas and the Vivanta by Taj hotel. It is the oldest tech park of Bengaluru and is located in Whitefield cluster. It was created as a result of a joint venture between India and Singapore in January 1994. It is a large facility, comprising 10 buildings – Discoverer, Innovator, Creator, Explorer, Inventor, Navigator, Voyager, Aviator, Pioneer, Victor and Anchor. This park provides campus facilities for multi national giants like IPsoft, General Motors, Société Générale, Mu Sigma, Xerox, Conduent, AT&T, Soais, Sharp, Scientific Games, Medtronic, iGATE, GE, Airtel, Moving Picture Company, TCS, Startek, Gyansys Infotech, Technicolor, Atos, Unisys, Delphi, Huawei, Oracle, Perot Systems, Applied Materials, GalaxE Solutions, First American Corporation and other medium and small sized companies. Outside ITPB, numerous companies have come up like Dell, Tesco, Shell, Aviva, GM, Schneider Electric, Sapient, Goodrich / UTC aerospace and DaimlerChrysler, Symphony Teleca Corp and Tangoe are also located in Whitefield.

== History ==
ITPL was established by a consortium of Singapore companies joining forces with the Tata Group and Karnataka government led by Deve Gowda to take on the project. Ascendas has been actively involved in ITPB since its inception in 1996 and has been a lead partner in the Singapore consortium that owns 47 per cent of the ITPL. To that 47 per cent has now been added the 47 per cent of the Tatas, with KIADB continuing to hold its 6 per cent stake. Two Former Chief Ministers of Karnataka – S.M.Krishna, Praven, Former Governor of Karnataka T. N. Chaturvedi & Prime Minister of Singapore Lee Hsien Loong & President S. R. Nathan have inaugurated each of the buildings in various tenures.

The Park was the first of its kind with the work-live-play environment to be built in India and has since become a role model for other IT Park-like projects in the country.

== Education and research ==
The Indian nonprofit research organization, the Institute of Bioinformatics (IOB) founded by The Genomics Research Trust and the Johns Hopkins University in Baltimore, Maryland, developed databases like NetPath, Human Protein Reference Database, Human Proteinpedia, India Cancer Research Database etc., is situated in this campus.

== Other Details ==
- Ideal For:
  - Call Center/BPO
  - Coaching Center
  - Private Consulting
  - Pathology Labs
  - Doctor Clinics
  - IT/ITES Services
  - Studio/Production House
  - Private Offices
- Facilities:
  - Basic Amenities: Power Backup, Lift, Reserved Parking, Visitor Parking, Water Storage
  - Security: CCTV Cameras, Fire Sprinklers, 24/7 Surveillance
  - Connectivity: Internet/Wi-Fi, Intercom Facility
  - Comfort & Accessibility: Air Conditioning, Service/Goods Lift, Wheelchair Accessibility
  - Business Essentials: Conference Room, Projector, Whiteboard, Printer, Tea/Coffee
  - Additional Features: RO Water System, Cafeteria/Food Court

== See also ==
- Electronic City
- Economy of Bangalore
