= Human Proteome Project =

Scientific project coordinated by the Human Proteome Organization

Content
- Description: Whole-proteome characterization
- Data types captured: protein sequence, phosphorylation, acetylation, glycosylation
- Organisms: Homo sapiens

Contact
- Research center: Human Proteome Organization
- Laboratory: various
- Primary citation: PMID 22398612

Access
- Website: www.thehpp.org www.c-hpp.org
- Web service URL: NextProt REST

The Human Proteome Project (HPP) is a collaborative effort coordinated by the Human Proteome Organization. Its stated goal is to experimentally observe all of the proteins produced by the sequences translated from the human genome.

== History ==
The Human Proteome Organization has served as a coordinating body for many long-running proteomics research projects associated with specific human tissues of clinical interest, such as blood plasma, liver, brain and urine. It has also been responsible for projects associated with specific technology and standards necessary for the large scale study of proteins.

The structure and goals of a larger project that would parallel the Human Genome Project has been debated in the scientific literature. The results of this debate and a series of meetings at the World Congresses of the Human Proteome Organization in 2009, 2010 and 2011 has been the decision to define the Human Proteome Project as being composed of two sub-projects, C-HPP and B/D-HPP. The C-HPP will be organized into 25 groups, one per human chromosome. The B/D-HPP will be organized into groups by the biological and disease relevance of proteins.

== Projects and groups ==
The current set of working groups are listed below, in order of the chromosome to be studied.

Chromosome	Group leader	National affiliation
1	Ping Xu	China
2	Lydie Lane	Switzerland
3	Takeshi Kawamura	Japan
4	Yu-Ju Chen	Taiwan
5	Peter Horvatovich	Netherlands
6	Christoph Borchers	Canada
7	Edward Nice	Australia, New Zealand
8	Pengyuan Yang	China
9	Je-Yoel Cho	Seoul, Korea
10	Joshua Labaer	USA
11	Jong Shin Yoo	Korea
12	Ravi Sirdeshmukh	India, Singapore, Taiwan, Thailand
13	Young Ki Paik	Korea
14	Charles Pineau	France
15	Gilberto B Domont	Brazil
16	Fernando Corrales	Spain
17	Gilbert S. Omenn	USA
18	Alex Archakov	Russia
19	György Marko-Varga	Sweden
20	Siqiu Liu	China
21	Albert Sickmann	Germany
22	Akhilesh Pandey	USA
X	Yasushi Ishihama	Japan
Y	Ghasem Hosseini Salekdeh	Iran
MT	Andrea Urbani	Italy

== Computational resources ==
Data reduction, analysis and validation of MS/MS based proteomics results is being provided by Eric Deutsch at the Institute for Systems Biology, Seattle, USA (PeptideAtlas). Data handling associated with antibody methods is being coordinated by Kalle von Feilitzen, Stockholm, Sweden (Human Protein Atlas). Overall integration and reporting informatics are the responsibility of Lydie Lane at SIB, Geneva, Switzerland (NeXtProt). All data generated as part of HPP contributions are deposited to one of the ProteomeXchange repositories.

== Current status ==
Updates on the Human Proteome Project are regularly published, e.g. in the Journal of Proteome Research (2014). Metrics for the level of confidence associated with protein observations have been published as has been a "MissingProteinPedia".

A review of nine major annotation portals gave a spread of human protein counts from 18,891 to 21,819 (as of 2017). The 2021 Metrics of the HPP show that protein expression has now been credibly detected 92.8% of the predicted proteins coded in the human genome.

== See also ==
- BioPlex
- Human Protein Atlas - Protein databases
- NeXtProt
- PeptideAtlas
- Human Proteome Folding Project
