= Expression Atlas =

Gene expression database

Content
- Description: Gene expression across species and conditions
- Data types captured: Microarray Data and other Gene Expression
- Organisms: Human, Mouse, Rat, Fruit-fly, Chicken, Roundworm, Wild boar, Zebrafish, Cow and others.

Contact
- Research center: EMBL-EBI
- Primary citation: PMID 31665515
- Release date: March 2020

Access
- Website: www.ebi.ac.uk/gxa/home

Tools
- Web: Advanced search, bulk retrieval/download

Miscellaneous
- Data release frequency: 3 to 4 times a year
- Curation policy: Manual curation of every study.

The Expression Atlas is a database maintained by the European Bioinformatics Institute that provides information on gene expression patterns from RNA-Seq and Microarray studies, and protein expression from Proteomics studies. The Expression Atlas allows searches by gene, splice variant, protein attribute, disease, treatment or organism part (cell types/tissues). Individual genes or gene sets can be searched for. All datasets in Expression Atlas have its metadata manually curated and its data analysed through standardised analysis pipelines. There are two components to the Expression Atlas, the Baseline Atlas and the Differential Atlas:

== Baseline Atlas ==
The Baseline Atlas provides information about which gene products are present (and at what abundance) under "normal" conditions. This component of the Expression Atlas consists of RNA-seq experiments from ArrayExpress repositories. It aims to answer questions such as:

- Which genes are specifically expressed in kidney?
- What is the expression pattern for gene SAA4 in normal tissues?

== Differential Atlas ==
The Differential Atlas allows users to identify genes that are up- or down-regulated in different experimental conditions.

== See also ==
- Human Protein Atlas
- The Cancer Genome Atlas
