= Proteomics Identifications Database =

Public database of protein mass spectrometry data in Europe

The PRIDE (PRoteomics IDEntifications database) is a public data repository of mass spectrometry-based proteomics data, and is maintained by the European Bioinformatics Institute as part of the Proteomics Team.

Originally designed by Lennart Martens in 2003 during a stay at the European Bioinformatics Institute as a Marie Curie fellow of the European Commission in the "Quality of Life" Programme (Contract number: QLRI-1999-50595), PRIDE was established as a production service in 2005. The original grant application document from June 2013 to start construction of PRIDE has since been published in a viewpoint article. Several similar proteomics databases have been built, including the GPMDB, PeptideAtlas, Proteinpedia and the NCBI Peptidome.

The PRIDE database constitutes a structured data repository, and stores the original experimental data from the researchers without editorial control over the submitted data.

In total, PRIDE contains data from about 60 species, the biggest fraction of it coming from human samples (including the data from the two draft human proteomes) followed by the fruit fly Drosophila melanogaster and mouse.

== Formats and the submission process ==
Since detailed proteomics data currently cannot be curated from the existing literature, the source of PRIDE data is solely submissions by academic researchers.

PRIDE is a standards-compliant public repository, meaning that its own XML-based data exchange format for submissions, PRIDE XML, was built around the Proteomics Standards Initiative mzData standard for mass spectrometry. Recently, PRIDE has been adapted to work with the modern mzML and mzIdentML standards of the Proteomics Standards Initiative. An additional format, dubbed mzTab, can be used as a simplified way to submit quantitative proteomics data.

As there are many types of different mass spectrometry instruments and software formats are currently on the market, wet-lab scientists without a strong bioinformatics background or informatics support were having problems converting their data to PRIDE XML. The development of PRIDE Converter helped to tackle this situation. PRIDE Converter is a tool, written in the Java programming language, that converts 15 different input mass spectrometry data formats into PRIDE XML via a wizard-like graphical user interface. It is freely available and is open source under the permissive Apache License. A new version of PRIDE Converter was released in 2012 as PRIDE Converter 2. This new version constituted a complete rewrite, focused on easy adaptability to different (and evolving) data sources.

== Browsing, searching and data mining PRIDE ==
Currently, data can be queried from PRIDE via the PRIDE web interface, through the stand-alone Java client PRIDE Inspector, or coupled directly to several search engines through PeptideShaker. Moreover, a new RESTful API allows convenient programmatic access to the PRIDE archive.

The extensive use of controlled vocabularies (CVs) and ontologies for flexible yet context-sensitive annotation of data, along with the ability to perform intelligent queries by these annotations, are key features of PRIDE.

== Involvement in ProteomeXchange ==
The ProteomeXchange consortium has been set up to provide a coordinated submission of MS proteomics data to the main existing proteomics repositories, and to encourage optimal data dissemination. The consortium contains several member databases, including PRIDE and PeptideAtlas. The earliest conception of ProteomeXchange stems from a meeting at the HUPO 2005 conference in Munich, where the main proteomics data repositories at the time agreed in principle to exchange their data, and thus provide a means for the user to find public proteomics data at any of the participating databases. Due to the rapid development of the field, and the need to first develop suitable standards for data exchange, it took almost ten years from that meeting to actually implement this system, an effort that was funded by the 'ProteomeXchange' Coordination Action grant of the European Commission's Seventh Framework Programme.

== Data recovery after the discontinuation of Peptidome ==
The NCBI Peptidome database was discontinued in 2011, yet a joint effort by the PRIDE and Peptidome teams resulted in the transfer of all Peptidome data to PRIDE.
