= R. Sirdeshmukh =

Indian scientist

Ravi Sirdeshmukh (Hindi: रवि सरदेशमुख) is an Indian cancer biologist and proteomics scientist. He is a distinguished scientist and incumbent associate director of the Institute of Bioinformatics (IOB) in Bangalore, founding president of the Proteomics Society, India and Principal Research Advisor at the Mazumdar Shaw Center for Translational Research (MSCTR) in Bangalore. He is also an elected member of the Council of Human Proteome Organization. He is most noted for his contributions in the Human Proteome Project where he served as the Group Leader for the countries like India, Singapore, Taiwan and Thailand. Sirdeshmukh is also an invited member of the Council of Asian Oceanean HUPO (AOHUPO).

== Education and career ==
Sirdeshmukh graduated with an M.Sc. in Biochemistry from Osmania University in Hyderabad, India. He then completed his Ph.D. at the Centre for Cellular and Molecular Biology (CCMB) in Hyderabad. He worked in the US as a visiting researcher at the Washington University School of Medicine and the National Institutes of Health.

Sirdeshmukh worked at CCMB for more than two decades and headed the proteomics laboratory as director before joining the Institute of Bioinformatics (IOB) as a distinguished scientist. He also works as a consultant in neuro-oncology research at the Mazumdar-Shaw Center for Translational Research (MSCTR), where he leads transnational research programs on brain tumors. Ravi Sirdeshmukh is a member of the research advisory boards of several institutes and centers, such as the US Pharmacopeia (USP) for protein therapeutics, the Human Proteome Organization (HUPO) and the Asian Oceanian HUPO (AOHUPO). He was also thereby connected to international research initiatives such as the Membrane Proteomics Initiative of AOHUPO and the Chromosome-Centric Human Proteome Project initiated by HUPO.

Sirdeshmukh is also a reviewer for various international proteomics journals and a member of the editorial board of the International Journal of Proteins and Proteomics. He is also the founding president of the Proteomics Society India.

== Research area ==
His research interests extend to the areas of protein and nucleic acid biochemistry and his previous work includes RNA processing, mRNA stability, structure-function relationship of ribonucleases and their regulation. More recently, his interest has been in the areas of proteomics of gliomas – a major class of brain tumors and head and neck cancers.

== Honors and positions ==
Sirdeshmukh has been honored with memberships in several national and international bodies. This includes

- Member of the Scientific Advisory Board: Institute of Cytology and Preventive Medicine (ICMR, Noida); Institute of Pathology, (ICMR, New Delhi); Council of Human Proteome Organization; Council of Asian Oceanean HUPO; National Facility for Advanced Proteomics and Protein Research (Indian Institute of Chemical Biology (IICB), Kolkata); US Pharmacopeia (US; responsible for protein and glycoprotein analysis)
- Biotechnology Study Committee Member: Osmania University (Hyderabad)
- Member of the editorial board: Journal of Proteomics and Bioinformatics
- Reviewer of scientific journals: Annals of Neurology, Journal of Proteome Research, Proteomics, Proteomics: Clinical Applications
- Head of the CSIR Proteomics Network for International Collaborations
- invited member of the Council of Human Proteome Organization (HUPO)

== Selected publications ==
- Chaiyarit, Sakdithep; Singhto, Nilubon; Chen, Yi-Ju; Cheng, Chia-Ying; Chiangjong, Wararat; Kanlaya, Rattiyaporn; Lam, Henry H. N.; Peerapen, Paleerath; Sung, Ting-Yi; Tipthara, Phornpimon; Pandey, Akhilesh; Poon, Terence C. W.; Chen, Yu-Ju; Sirdeshmukh, Ravi; Chung, Maxey C. M. (3 July 2014). "Chromosome-centric Human Proteome Project (C-HPP): Chromosome 12". Journal of Proteome Research. 13 (7): 3160–3165. doi:10.1021/pr500009j. ISSN 1535-3893. PMID 24831074.
- Polisetty, Ravindra Varma; Gautam, Poonam; Gupta, Manoj Kumar; Sharma, Rakesh; Uppin, Megha S.; Challa, Sundaram; Ankathi, Praveen; Purohit, Aniruddh K.; Renu, Durairaj; Harsha, H. C.; Pandey, Akhilesh; Sirdeshmukh, Ravi (5 July 2013). "Heterogeneous Nuclear Ribonucleoproteins and Their Interactors Are a Major Class of Deregulated Proteins in Anaplastic Astrocytoma: A Grade III Malignant Glioma". Journal of Proteome Research. 12 (7): 3128–3138. doi:10.1021/pr400339h. ISSN 1535-3893. PMID 23741984.
- Kim, Min-Sik; Pinto, Sneha M.; Getnet, Derese; Nirujogi, Raja Sekhar; Manda, Srikanth S.; Chaerkady, Raghothama; Madugundu, Anil K.; Kelkar, Dhanashree S.; Isserlin, Ruth; Jain, Shobhit; Thomas, Joji K.; Muthusamy, Babylakshmi; Leal-Rojas, Pamela; Kumar, Praveen; Sahasrabuddhe, Nandini A. (May 2014). "A draft map of the human proteome". Nature. 509 (7502): 575–581. Bibcode:2014Natur.509..575K. doi:10.1038/nature13302. ISSN 1476-4687. PMC 4403737. PMID 24870542.
- Mushahary, D.; Gautam, P.; Sundaram, C. S.; Sirdeshmukh, R. (1 February 2013). "Expanded protein expression profile of human placenta using two-dimensional gel electrophoresis". Placenta. 34 (2): 193–196. doi:10.1016/j.placenta.2012.11.015. ISSN 0143-4004. PMID 23261269.
- Gautam, Poonam; Upadhyay, Santosh Kumar; Hassan, Wazid; Madan, Taruna; Sirdeshmukh, Ravi; Sundaram, Curam Sreenivasacharlu; Gade, Wasudev Namdeo; Basir, Seemi Farhat; Singh, Yogendra; Sarma, Puranam Usha (1 November 2011). "Transcriptomic and Proteomic Profile of Aspergillus fumigatus on Exposure to Artemisinin". Mycopathologia. 172 (5): 331–346. doi:10.1007/s11046-011-9445-3. ISSN 1573-0832. PMID 21755315. S2CID 23190599.
- Peng, Lifeng; Kapp, Eugene A.; Fenyö, David; Kwon, Min-Seok; Jiang, Pu; Wu, Songfeng; Jiang, Ying; Aguilar, Marie-Isabel; Ahmed, Nikhat; Baker, Mark S.; Cai, Zongwei; Chen, Yu-Ju; Van Chi, Phan; Chung, Maxey C. M.; He, Fuchu (November 2010). "The Asia Oceania Human Proteome Organisation Membrane Proteomics Initiative. Preparation and characterisation of the carbonate-washed membrane standard". Proteomics. 10 (22): 4142–4148. doi:10.1002/pmic.201000126. ISSN 1615-9853. PMC 3891941. PMID 20486120.
- Mathivanan, Suresh; Ahmed, Mukhtar; Ahn, Natalie G.; Alexandre, Hainard; Amanchy, Ramars; Andrews, Philip C.; Bader, Joel S.; Balgley, Brian M.; Bantscheff, Marcus; Bennett, Keiryn L.; Björling, Erik; Blagoev, Blagoy; Bose, Ron; Brahmachari, Samir K.; Burlingame, Alma S. (February 2008). "Human Proteinpedia enables sharing of human protein data". Nature Biotechnology. 26 (2): 164–167. doi:10.1038/nbt0208-164. hdl:10261/60528. ISSN 1546-1696. PMID 18259167. S2CID 205265347.
