= USP27X =

Enzyme found in humans

Identifiers
- Aliases: USP27X, USP22L, USP27, ubiquitin specific peptidase 27, X-linked, MRX105, ubiquitin specific peptidase 27 X-linked, XLID105
- External IDs: OMIM: 300975; MGI: 1859645; GeneCards: USP27X
Enzyme activity
EC #	BRENDA	ExPASy	KEGG	MetaCyc
3.4.19.12	↗	↗	↗	↗

Gene location (Human)
Chr.	X chromosome (human)
Band	Xp11.23	Start	49,879,484 bp
Band	Xp11.23	End	49,882,558 bp

Gene location (Mouse)
Chr.	X chromosome (mouse)
Band	X A1.1|X 3.31 cM	Start	7,237,513 bp
Band	X A1.1|X 3.31 cM	End	7,242,069 bp
RNA expression pattern
Bgee	Human / Mouse (ortholog); Top expressed in: buccal mucosa cell; endothelial cell; cerebellar vermis; placenta; Brodmann area 23; entorhinal cortex; middle temporal gyrus; cerebellar hemisphere; lateral nuclear group of thalamus; right hemisphere of cerebellum / Top expressed in: supraoptic nucleus; zygote; transitional epithelium of urinary bladder; oocyte; secondary oocyte; primary oocyte; arcuate nucleus; lumbar subsegment of spinal cord; dorsomedial hypothalamic nucleus; ventromedial nucleus; More reference expression data
BioGPS	n/a
Gene ontology
Molecular function	thiol-dependent deubiquitinase; peptidase activity; cysteine-type peptidase activity; hydrolase activity; Lys63-specific deubiquitinase activity; Lys48-specific deubiquitinase activity
Cellular component	nucleus; cytoplasm; cytosol
Biological process	ubiquitin-dependent protein catabolic process; proteolysis; protein deubiquitination; positive regulation of apoptotic process; protein stabilization; protein K63-linked deubiquitination; protein K48-linked deubiquitination
Sources:Amigo / QuickGO
Orthologs
Databases	NCBI: entry; OMA: entry
Species	Human	Mouse
Entrez	389856	54651
Ensembl	ENSG00000273820	ENSMUSG00000046269
UniProt	A6NNY8	Q8CEG8
RefSeq (mRNA)	NM_001145073	NM_019461
RefSeq (protein)	NP_001138545	NP_062334
Location (UCSC)	Chr X: 49.88 – 49.88 Mb	Chr X: 7.24 – 7.24 Mb
PubMed search
- Wikidata
View/Edit Human	View/Edit Mouse

The ubiquitin carboxyl-terminal hydrolase 27 (EC 3.4.19.12), also known as deubiquitinating enzyme 27, ubiquitin thioesterase 27 and USP27X, is an enzyme that in humans is encoded by the gene USP27X. It is a deubiquitinating enzyme which is mainly characterized for cleaving ubiquitin (Ub) from proteins and other molecules. Ubiquitin binds to proteins so as to regulate the degradation of them via the proteasome and lysosome among many other functions.

USP27X is encoded by the ubiquitin specific peptidase 27 X-linked gene, found in chromosome X in region Xp11.23. It is mainly found in the cytosol and nucleus of cells, as well as the nucleoplasm and in vesicles. It is an intracellular protein found in many human tissues with low blood cell specificity.

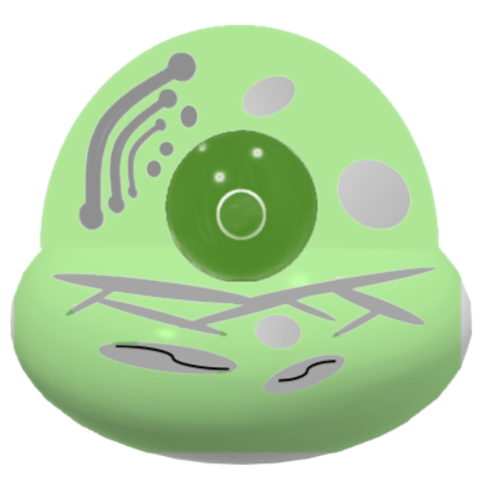
The green parts indicate the presence of USP27X protein in the human cell.

DUBs belong to the superfamily of proteases enzymes. Proteases can be classified into five different classes depending on the mechanism of catalysis: aspartic, metallo, serine, threonine and cystein proteases.

Cysteine proteases comprise ubiquitin C-terminal hydrolases (UCHs), Machada Josepchin domain proteases (MJDs), ovarian tumour proteases (OTU) and ubiquitin-specific proteases (USPs). USP27X is included in the ubiquitin-specific proteases enzymes.

Ec	3.4.19.12
Taxonomic identifier (assigned by the NCBI)	9606
Taxonomic lineage	eukaryota → metazoa → chordata → craniata → vertebrata → euteleostomi → mammalia → eutheria → euarchontoglires → primates → haplorrhini → catarrhini → homonidae → homo
Length	1574bp
Mass	49.6299 kDa
Gene Location (in humans)	Cytogenetic band: Xp11.23
Cellular location	nucleus, cytoplasm
Databases	accession ID
HumanCyc	HS17606
UniProt, nextProt	A6NNY8
HGNC	HGNC:13486
proteomics DB	A6NNY8
biogrid	133302

== Protein structure ==
Deubiquitinating enzymes contain a conserved catalytic domain surrounded by other subdomains, some of which are known to contribute to target recognition, protein-protein interactions and location domains. Specifically, USP domains are characterized for having interspersed points with insertions in the catalytic domain. This insertions have the capacity of folding into independent domains that can be involved in the regulation of the enzyme's activity.

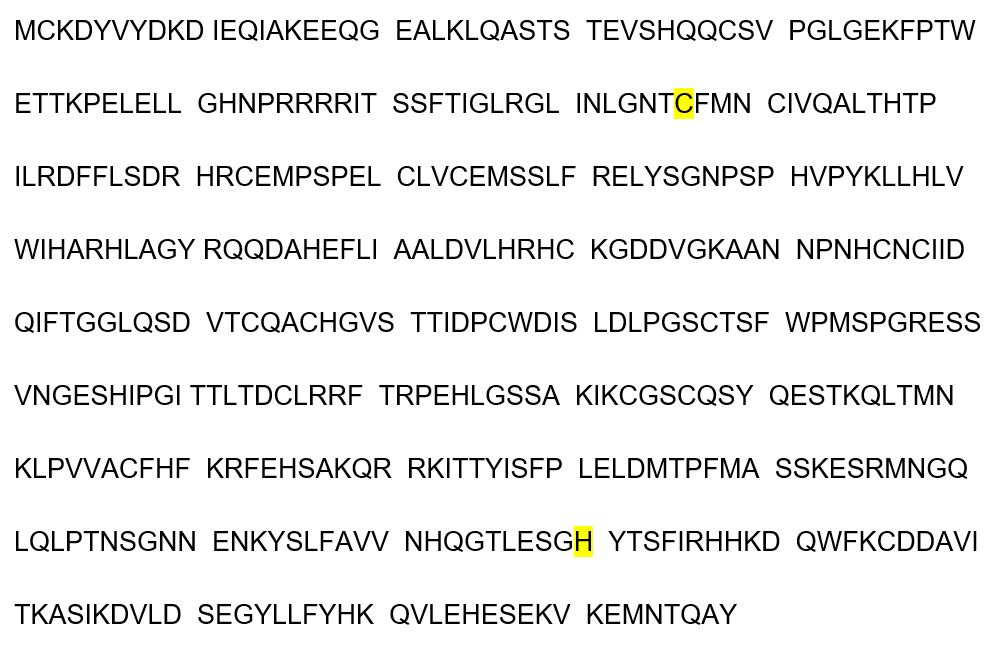
Primary structure of USP27X. The highlighted aminoacids have a key role in the catalytic activity.

All USP domains, including USP27X, can be divided into six conserved boxes that are mapped onto the USP domain core structure. These structures have been identified through multiple sequence alignment of the USP catalytic cores. Box 1 is known to contain the catalytic cysteine (Cys) residue, box 5 contains the catalytic histidine (His) residue, box 6 contains the catalytic asparagine (Asn)/ aspartate (Asp) residue. Box 3 and box 4 can vary its content although in most human USP enzyme domains each contain a conserved Cys-X-X-Cys motif, which is commonly associated with a zinc-binding site.

USP27X has a length of 438 aminoacids. The residues that play a critical role in the active site can be found in position 87, in which resides the nucleophilic residue, and position 380 in which the proton acceptor is located.

The number of aminoacids in USPs catalytic domain can vary from 295 and 850 residues. This variations suggest that either different subclasses of USP domains exist (variations of a catalyc fold) or that insertions are incorporated into a similar catalytic fold.

== Function ==
As previously said USP27X belongs to deubiquitinase family, thus its main function is catalyzing the removal of ubiquitin from substrates (cleaving the bond between the last aminoacid of ubiquitin, glycine 76, and a lysine residue on the substrate), the reversal process of ubiquitination, regulating the fate of ubiquitin-conjugated proteins.

Based on its conserved catalytic domains and its mechanism of catalysis, deubiquitinating enzymes are classified in the group of cysteine proteases. These enzymes use catalytic triads (groups of three aminoacids) to catalyze the hydrolysis of the amine bonds between the ubiquitin and the substrate. USP27X's catalytic triad is constituted by a cysteine, a histidine, and a third residue, which tends to be an asparagine.

The ubiquitin is linked to the polypeptide molecule by an isopeptide bond between the carboxyl group (COO^{−}) of ubiquitin's last glycine and the epsilon-amino group (ε-NH3+) of the substrate's lysine. The Asp functions to polarize and orient the imidazolium ring of the His, while the His gains a proton desprotonating the thiol group of the adjacent Cys. This Cys attacks on the isopeptide carbonyl carbon, breaking carbon's double bond with oxygen and converting it into a simple bond. At the same time, the His gives its proton to the lysine epsilon-amino group, forming a bond between them. The isopeptide bond is broken and the carbonyl group (double bond) remade. The result of the reaction is the release of the target protein from histidine and the formation of a covalent intermediate with the Ub moiety since the bond between the thiol group from the cysteine and the carbon is broken and a new radical binds to the carboxyl group. Finally, a reaction of this intermediate with a water molecule results in the release of the free enzyme and Ub molecule.

The Ub-proteasome system is the fundamental regulatory mechanism of protein stability, quality, and abundance, so USP27X plays a key role in a great number of processes regulated by this system, such as Snail 1 stabilization in pancreatic and breast cancer, resistance to chemotherapeutic agents on cancerous cells, e. g., Cisplatin, and it also intervenes on the regulation of Bim in melanoma and non-small cell lung cancer cells.

== Clinical relevance ==
USP27X deubiquitinating action has been discovered to regulate the presence of multiple proteins related to various human cancers, as well as affecting cancerous cells' resistance to chemotherapeutic agents.

=== Regulation of snail1 in pancreatic and breast cancer ===
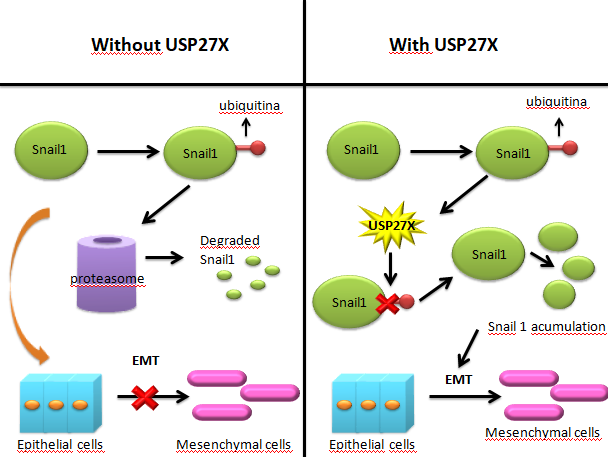
Snail 1 regulation by USP27X

Cancerous cells gain the ability to migrate towards other parts of the body and to invade other tissues through what is called epithelial-mesenchymal transition. This process consists of a series of biochemical changes that transform an epithelial polarized cancerous cell into a cell with a mesenchymal phenotype. This new phenotype gives the cell an increased ability to migrate and invade other tissues, while it also decreases apoptotic activity. Therefore, EMT allows the cancerous cell to abandon the epithelial layer in which it originated, and migrate to other tissues. This is how metastasis in epithelial cancer begins. EMT is controlled by various mesenchymal markers, amongst them Snail1, a protein also necessary in the activation of cancer associated fibroblasts (CAF). In a normal epithelial cell, Snail1 is continuously degraded by proteasomes, due to its previous ubiquitination. However, in cancer cells and CAFs, Snail1 degradation is prevented. One of the mechanisms that cancerous cells use to do so is USP27X. This protein deubiquitinates Snail1, meaning it cannot be degraded, therefore causing it to stabilize and to activate EMT, allowing metastasis. In cancerous cells, USP27X is regulated by TGFβ, and, summarizing, it causes the stabilization of Snail1 and other mesenchymal markers, leading to EMT. Although USP27X is not the only deubiquitinase that affects Snail1, it is one of the most effective and it has been proved to directly increase Snail1 presence by preventing its degradation. USP27X mechanism was observed in breast and pancreatic cancers, therefore opening a new door for treatments. Inhibition of USP27X would cause Snail1 to be ubiquitinated and then degraded, and therefore it would impair EMT.

=== Influence on cancerous cells' resistance to chemotherapeutic agents ===
Snail1 has also been shown to increase the resistance of cancerous cells to certain chemotherapeutic agents, such as Cisplatin. When treated with Cisplatin, the amount of Snail1 increased, and this made the cells more resistant. However, when cisplatin was used in USP27X KO cells (cells without USP27X presence), Snail1 wasn't upregulated. This suggests that, after treatment with Cisplatin, Snail1 requires USP27X in order to increase its presence and make cells resistant. Therefore, inhibition of USP27X would impair Snail1 stabilization, leading to an increase in cancerous cells’ sensitivity to Cisplatin.

=== Regulation of bim in melanoma and non-small cell lung cancer cells ===
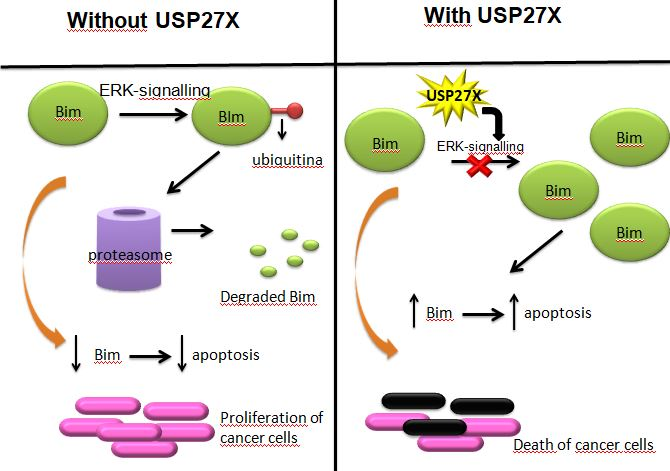
Bim regulation by USP27X

Bim is one of the proteins that induces apoptosis, and its depletion has been observed in multiple human tumours, meaning that cancer cells have mechanisms to avoid Bim expression or to degrade it, therefore annulling its apoptotic effects.

In some cancers, Bim is downregulated thanks to ERK-signaling. Phosphorylation and ubiquitination of Bim dependent on ERK caused Bim to be degraded in proteasomes. However, presence of USP27X reduced ERK deubiquitination of BIM, causing Bim to stabilize and therefore increasing its apoptotic effects. This process has been proved in melanoma and non-small cell lung cancer (nsclc) cells.

Accordingly, we can conclude that USP27X can act as a tumour suppressor by inhibiting ERK-signalling, causing the deubiquitination and consequent stabilization of Bim, allowing it to induce apoptosis in cancer cells that use ERK-signalling.

=== X-linked cognitive disorder ===
A relationship has been established between X-linked intellectual disability and certain mutations in the USP27X gene; specifically, an error in the reading of this gene causes a premature stop codon in the protein USP27X. Not much is known about the function of the USP27X protein yet, but its gene was found in mouse serotonin neurons, and that might mean that it is important for the serotonergetic function. USP27X interacts with USP22 which interacts with the KIF7 gene, which signals pathways involved in early development, cell growth and cell specialisation. Besides, other proteins from the same peptidase C19 family such as the USP9X have been linked to several neurologic disorders.
