= PeptideAtlas =

PeptideAtlas is a proteomics data resource that gathers tandem mass spectrometry datasets from around the world, reprocesses them with the Trans-Proteomic Pipeline, and makes the combined result freely available to the community. Peptide Atlas is one of the founding members of the ProteomeXchange Consortium.

== History ==
The earliest conception of PeptideAtlas began at the Institute for Systems Biology in the research lab of Ruedi Aebersold by Eric Deutsch and Sharon Chen at the Annotated Peptide Database (APD). The concept was further expanded with additional efforts from Parag Mallick and Frank Desiere. The first instance for an ensemble of human experiments was published in 2004 as the Human PeptideAtlas.

The concept was further expanded to many other species over the years with major effort by Nichole King, Zhi Sun, Terry Farrah, and Dave Campbell.

== Current status ==
PeptideAtlas is still maintained and developed at the Institute for Systems Biology in the research lab of Robert Moritz, led by Eric Deutsch, and with significant efforts by Zhi Sun and Dave Campbell.

== See also ==
- Human proteome project
- Human Protein Atlas
- NeXtProt
