= Stable isotope standards and capture by anti-peptide antibodies =

Stable isotope standards and capture by anti-peptide antibodies (SISCAPA) is a mass spectrometry method for measuring the amount of a protein in a biological sample.

== History ==
Introduced in 2004, the method has been used in a variety of studies in the field of proteomics, as well as in clinical blood tests in reference laboratories, and combines the advantageous features of mass spectrometry with those of conventional immunoassays. SISCAPA is used for measurement of specific pre-selected proteins and peptides (i.e., directed assays) rather than for broad exploration of sample contents (the typical objective of proteomics discovery or survey experiments).

== Method ==
SISCAPA is an extension of the well-known gold-standard methods of stable-isotope dilution for quantitation of small molecules by mass spectrometry (MS). Rather than measure an intact protein directly by mass spectrometry, SISCAPA makes use of proteolytic digestion (e.g., with the enzyme trypsin) to cleave sample proteins into smaller peptides ideally suited to quantitation by mass spectrometry. By selecting a target peptide whose sequence occurs only in the selected target protein (a so-called “proteotypic” peptide), the target peptide can serve as a direct quantitative surrogate for the target protein (assuming the digestion process is complete, or at least reproducible). A synthetic version of the target peptide containing a stable isotope label is added in a known amount to the digested sample to serve as an internal standard (SIS). Since the target peptide and SIS are chemically indistinguishable throughout the workflow, but can be measured separately by a mass spectrometer due to the mass difference of the stable isotope label, their ratio provides the desired quantitative estimate of the target peptide amount.

The SISCAPA workflow adds a specific enrichment step to the isotope dilution method in which a selected target peptide, together with its associated SIS internal standard, is captured by a sequence-specific anti-peptide antibody. The antibody, together with the captured target peptide, is then separated from the complex sample digest, after which the highly purified peptide is eluted from the antibody and delivered to a mass spectrometer for measurement. The capture step has been implemented using antibodies bound to magnetic beads as well as antibodies immobilized on flow-through columns. Addition of this specific capture step provides two primary advantages in comparison with a conventional workflow analyzing an unfractionated sample digest: sensitivity and throughput.

The antibody can be used to capture the target peptide (and SIS) from a much larger mass of sample than could be analyzed directly by MS, thus allowing lower concentrations to be measured. In practice, assay sensitivity can be improved by 1,000-10,000-fold by this approach.

By removing the unbound (non-target) peptides present in the sample digest, the sample presented to the mass spectrometer is drastically simplified, thus reducing the need for peptide separation by liquid chromatography prior to MS analysis. In some cases liquid chromatography has been eliminated entirely, resulting in MS cycle times of 7-20 sec rather than 5–40 minutes required in typical unfractionated digest protocols involving extensive chromatographic separation.

By virtue of the extreme specificity of mass spectrometric detection, SISCAPA assays can be combined into multiplex panels without cross-assay interference. Panels combining 22, 50, and 150 assays into a single operation have been demonstrated.

SISCAPA’s use of proteolytic digestion as a first step eliminates the protein:protein complexes (including complexes of a target protein with auto-antibodies) that cause “interferences” in protein capture assays, including conventional immunoassays (e.g., ELISA assays). Elimination of such autoantibody interferences drove the adoption of SISCAPA as an alternative to immunoassays for clinical measurement of thyroglobulin as a marker of thyroid cancer recurrence in patients who exhibit anti-thyroglobulin autoantibodies.

A limitation of the specific peptide capture approach is the requirement for a specially developed antibody against the selected peptide. To date several hundred anti-peptide antibody reagents have been developed for enrichment of tryptic peptides from sample digests, mainly for established clinical biomarkers (,) and cancer research targets, but these do not yet cover a majority of protein targets of interest in non-cancer research or clinical contexts.

A variety of MS instrument types have been used for quantitation of the enriched peptides, including most frequently triple quadrupole mass spectrometers implementing the “multiple reaction monitoring” (MRM) method (a format sometimes referred to as “immuno-MRM”), and MALDI-ToF (a format sometimes referred to as iMALDI).

== Related methods ==
Alternative specific enrichment methods include MSIA (“mass spectrometric immunoassay”,) in which antibodies are used to enrich target proteins, which are analyzed intact by MS; and hybrid methods in which antibodies are used to enrich target proteins, which are then digested prior to peptide detection by MS.
