= Human Proteinpedia =

Human protein data-sharing portal

Human Proteinpedia, which is closely associated with Institute of Bioinformatics (IOB), Bangalore and Johns Hopkins University, is a portal for sharing and integration of human proteomic data. It allows research laboratories to contribute and maintain protein annotations. Human Protein Reference Database (HPRD) integrates data, that is deposited in Human Proteinpedia along with the existing literature curated information at the context of an individual protein. In essence, researchers can add new data to HPRD by registering to Human Proteinpedia. The data deposited in Human Proteinpedia is freely available for download. Emphasizing the importance of proteomics data disposition to public repositories, Nature Methods recommends Human Proteinpedia in their editorial. More than 70 labs participate in this effort.

== Data types ==
Data pertaining to post-translational modifications, protein–protein interactions, tissue expression, expression in cell lines, subcellular localization and enzyme substrate relationships can be submitted to Human Proteinpedia.

== Experimental platforms ==
Protein annotations present in Human Proteinpedia are derived from a number of platforms such as

1. Co-immunoprecipitation and mass spectrometry-based protein–protein interaction
2. Co-immunoprecipitation and Western blotting based protein–protein interaction
3. Fluorescence based experiments
4. Immunohistochemistry
5. Mass spectrometric analysis
6. Protein and peptide microarrays
7. Western blotting
8. Yeast two-hybrid based protein–protein interaction

This portal that allows adding of protein information was developed as a collaborative effort between the laboratory of Dr. Akhilesh Pandey at Johns Hopkins University and the Institute of Bioinformatics.

== FAQs ==
* What are the criteria for contributing data?

Any investigator who fulfills the following criteria can contribute data:

i) provides experimentally derived data, and,

ii) is willing to share data, and,

iii) is willing to be listed as the 'contributor' of the data

* Can I contribute data anonymously?

Anonymous contributions are not allowed. Contributor details should be clearly presented while contributing data.

* Can bioinformatically predicted data be shared through Human Proteinpedia?

Predictions of any type are not allowed. Contributed data should be derived experimentally and should be accompanied with experimental evidence.

* Is the contributed data subjected to peer review?

The data are not subjected to peer review and the actual experimental data (raw or processed) should be provided.

* What will happen to conflicting results from different laboratories?

In cases where a given entry is documented as erroneous, we will consult with the contributing group(s) about deleting the entry.
