= NetPath =

Content
- Description: curated signal transduction pathways.

Contact
- Laboratory: Institute of Bioinformatics, Bangalore
- Primary citation: Kandasamy & al. (2010)
- Release date: 2010

Access
- Website: http://www.netpath.org

NetPath is a manually curated resource of human signal transduction pathways. It is a joint effort between Pandey Lab at the Johns Hopkins University and the Institute of Bioinformatics (IOB), Bangalore, India, and is also worked on by other parties.

NetPath hosts 45 signaling pathways, including 10 pathways with a major role in the regulation of immune system and 10 pathways with relevance to regulation of cancer.

== Overview ==
The 45 pathways contain information pertaining to protein-protein interactions, enzyme-protein substrate reactions which bring about post translational modifications (PTMs) and also a catalogue of genes which are differentially regulated upon activation of specific ligand mediated receptor pathways. The molecules which localises to different cellular organelles due to their PTMs or specific protein-protein interactions which occur downstream of ligand-receptor mediated pathway are available under translocation events. Recently, NetPath has also curated the molecules involved in the transcriptional regulation of genes in the context of immune signaling pathways. The reactions in NetPath are curated by PhD level scientists from experimental evidence available in published research articles. NetPath also contains textual description of its reactions with information on PTMs, dependence of PTMs on various signaling reactions, subcellular location, protein interaction domains or motifs and the cell type or cell line in which reactions are proved. The information in NetPath is linked to their corresponding research articles and are frequently updated. Each pathway is subjected to different level of internal quality checks and peer-review by the pathway experts and authorities.

== Development ==
NetPath was developed using PathBuilder, an open source software application for annotating and developing pathway resources. PathBuilder enables annotation of molecular events including protein-protein interactions, enzyme-substrate relationships and protein translocation events via manual or automatic methods. The features of PathBuilder include automatic validation of data formats, built-in modules for visualizing pathways, automated import of data from other pathway resources, export of data in several standard data exchange formats and an application programming interface for retrieving pathway datasets.

== Data availability ==
All 45 pathways are freely downloadable in BioPAX, PSI-MI and SBML formats. BioPAX is an emerging standard for pathway data exchange. The pathways are made available under an adaptive Creative Commons License 2.5 which stipulates that the pathways may be used if adequate credit is given to the authors.

== Immune signaling pathways ==
The following immune signaling pathways are hosted by Netpath:

- B cell receptor pathway
- T cell receptor pathway
- Interleukin-1 pathway
- Interleukin-2 pathway
- Interleukin-3 pathway
- Interleukin-4 pathway
- Interleukin-5 pathway
- Interleukin-6 pathway
- Interleukin-7 pathway
- Interleukin-9 pathway

== Cancer signaling pathways ==
The cancer signaling pathways were developed in collaboration with the Computational Biology Center at Memorial Sloan–Kettering Cancer Center and with Bader Lab at the University of Toronto for the "Cancer Cell Map". The following cancer signaling pathways are hosted by Netpath:

- Epidermal growth factor receptor Pathway
- Transforming growth factor beta receptor pathway
- Tumor necrosis factor alpha pathway
- Alpha6 Beta4 Integrin pathway
- Inhibitor of DNA binding pathway
- Hedgehog pathway
- Notch pathway
- Wnt pathway
- Androgen receptor pathway
- Kit receptor pathway

== Current statistics ==
| Curated pathways | 45 |
| Molecules involved | 1,053 |
| Physical interactions | 2,448 |
| Genes transcriptionally regulated | 7,401 |
| Transport | 284 |
| Enzyme catalysis | 1,597 |
| PubMed citations | 2,228 |

== Community participation programme ==
The community participation programme is aimed at training the students in various universities from India on curation of pathway reactions. This is a joint programme led by the Institute of Bioinformatics (IOB), Bangalore, India with active participation from Akhilesh Pandey's laboratory at the Johns Hopkins University (USA) and Gary Bader's lab at the University of Toronto, Canada. Currently, students from 3 major Indian Universities namely Pondicherry University, University of Pune and University of Mysore are participants of this community effort.
