= Proteomic profiling =

Medical diagnostic technique

Proteomic profiling is the large-scale analysis of proteins, which is essential for understanding biological processes and disease mechanisms. A proteomic profile may be employed to discover or diagnose diseases or conditions, which can monitor responses to therapeutic measures. Sometimes, it is also referred to as a protein expression profile and protein signature. Proteome profiling analysis is the analysis of the entire proteome from complex samples such as complete cells, tissues, and body fluids. It is most used for identifying as many peptides and proteins as possible. Proteome profiling analysis based on mass spectrometry (MS) can provide reference information for high-throughput quantitative proteomics and protein modification analysis. Recent studies have compared various platforms, such as SomaScan and Olink, and highlighted differences in precision, accuracy, and phenotypic associations across diverse cohorts.

== Key techniques and innovations ==
Advanced emerging technologies in proteomics profiling are revolutionizing sensitivity, speed, and data analysis capabilities. Some key milestones in advances have been:

Single-cell proteomics

Techniques of SCOPE-MS and prioritized Single Cell ProtEomics (pSCoPE) allow for deep analysis of individual cells and thus increase the proteome depth and resolution.

Mass spectrometry innovations

Thermo Fisher's Orbitrap Astral enables the measurement of thousands of proteins from minimal samples in under 20 minutes.

Machine learning integration

Artificial Intelligence is being used to predict and validate mass spectrometry results, thereby improving accuracy and efficiency in data interpretation.

Immuno-ligation methods

High-throughput multiplex assays allow for the simultaneous detection of multiple proteins and thus improve profiling capabilities. This is opening up avenues to even more clinical applications with increased precision and biology.

== Proteomic profiling in disease detection ==
Proteomics profiling has been used in the discovery of biomarkers for diseases. A study conducted with the use of the Olink Proteomics Platform found that patients with glaucoma had differently expressed metabolic proteins, thus the potential of proteomics in early disease detection and development of a therapeutic strategy.

== Techniques for data analysis ==
Global proteome profiling is the direct representation of the protein set in an organism, organ, tissues, or an organelle. Among the primary goals of proteomic analysis is to compare and determine the relative quantities of proteins under a defined set of conditions. Over the last 4 decades, two-dimensional gel electrophoresis has gained popularity because it successfully helped differential proteomics provide visual proof of changes in protein abundance that cannot be predicted from genome analysis. Each protein spot on a 2-DE gel can be analyzed based on its abundance, location, or even presence and absence. This flexible gel-based method combines and makes use of the best principle for separation of protein complexes based on their charge and mass, visual mapping coupled with successful mass spectrometric identification of individual proteins.

Latest developments in proteomics have paved the way for the discovery of techniques such as colocalization analysis (COLA), which detects protein–protein co-localizations at a global scale. This helps map interactome dynamics under various conditions, making it possible to understand protein interactions and functions. Proteomic profiling relates to each individual's physiological changes by the monitoring of protein expression variations according to factors such as aging, exercise, and environmental conditions. For example, in aging muscle, proteomic analysis showed changes in protein isoforms and altered metabolic pathways that indicate adaptations in muscle functions and energy metabolism.

== Proteomics in cancer and tumor microenvironment ==
In addition, proteomic approaches are very useful in characterizing tumor microenvironments, which show how populations of cells influence cancer progression through protein interactions. Proteomics is especially well suited to the analysis of the microenvironment, considering that the origin of many components of the microenvironment is host tissue, with no appreciable genomic alteration detectable, and that the release and shedding of proteins from the surface of cancer cells contribute significantly, all of which cannot be predicted strictly from genomic analysis. It especially helped advance proteomic analysis toward a better understanding of how tumor cells manipulate their microenvironment by producing structural proteins of ECM, modifying proteins of ECM, and proteases. Proteomics has also further advanced the global identification of protease targets.

== Importance ==
Proteomic profiling is important in the advancement of our understanding of biological processes and mechanisms of disease. It helps in pathogen identification, thereby enhancing diagnostics and vaccine development by revealing protein interactions and functions related to virulence. Protein profiling has greatly helped in the early detection of cancers by using specific proteins found in the blood plasma. Recent studies have developed proteome-based tests with a high degree of accuracy in the detection of early stage cancers, using panels of proteins that distinguish cancerous from normal samples. For example, it has recently been demonstrated that using panels of ten sex-specific proteins, early-stage cancer could be identified with up to 93% accuracy in males and 84% in females at high specificity levels.
