= Institute of Bioinformatics, Bengaluru =

Indian academic research organization

Institute of Bioinformatics (IOB)
- Type: Autonomous not-for-profit research organization
- Established: 2002
- Director: Dr. Akhilesh Pandey (Founder and Director); Dr. Ravi Sirdeshmukh (Associate Director)
- Location: Bangalore, Karnataka, India
- Campus: Urban
- Nickname: IOB or IoB
- Website: www.ibioinformatics.org

The Institute of Bioinformatics, often referred to as IOB, is an Indian not-for-profit academic research organization based in Bangalore, India. It is involved in research in the fields of bioinformatics, multi-omics, systems biology and neurological disorders. In 2002, the institute was set up by The Genomics Research Trust and the Johns Hopkins University of Baltimore, Maryland. This organization is recognized as a 'Scientific and Industrial Research Organization' (SIRO) of the Department of Scientific and Industrial Research, Government of India. Renowned Proteomicist Akhilesh Pandey, Professor at Department of Laboratory Medicine and Pathology, Center for Individualized Medicine of Mayo Clinic in Rochester, Minnesota, US is the Founding and current Director of IOB, and eminent Proteomicist Ravi Sirdeshmukh, Founder President of the 'Proteomic Society of India' is the current Associate Director of IOB.

== Databases developed by IOB ==
- Human Protein Reference Database (in collaboration with the Pandey Lab, Johns Hopkins University)
- Human Proteinpedia
- NetPath
- India Cancer Research Database
- Human Proteome Map
- Plasma Proteome Database
- Pancreatic Cancer Database
- Resource of Asian Primary Immunodeficiency Diseases

== Funding Agencies ==
IOB receives grants and fundings from various national and international funding agencies.

=== National funding agencies ===
- Council of Scientific and Industrial Research
- University Grants Commission (India)
- Indian Council of Medical Research
- Department of Biotechnology
- Department of Science and Technology (India)

=== International funding agencies ===
- Human Proteome Organization

=== Others ===
- Wellcome Trust/DBT India Alliance

== Affiliation ==
IOB is affiliated with Manipal Academy of Higher Education (MAHE) for the award of Ph.D. degrees.

== Achievements and global recognition ==
IOB is the first research institute globally which has been successfully able to decipher a nearly complete protein map of human beings. In May 2014, the journal Nature published their volume putting this achievement of IOB with title 'The Human Proteome' in their cover. On February 17, 2016, the Government of India's Department of Science and Technology (DST) released "India's Research Landscape: Output, Collaboration, and Comparative Performance - Bibliometric Studies," which included two reports. The first report, titled "India's Research Output and Collaboration (2005-14): A Bibliometric Study," was compiled by Thomson Reuters, while the second report, titled "International Comparative Performance of India's Research Base (2009-14)," was independently compiled by Elsevier. According to Thomson Reuters, the paper "Human Protein Reference Database," published in 2009, was ranked second among the top 10 Publications with Indian Affiliation in the field of Biology and Biochemistry, and "A draft map of human proteome," featured on the cover of Nature in 2014, was found to be cited more than 400 times in a short period of time and was ranked sixth.
