= Mass spectrometric immunoassay =

Mass spectrometric immunoassay (MSIA) is a rapid method is used to detect and/ or quantify antigens and or antibody analytes. This method uses an analyte affinity (either through antigens or antibodies) isolation to extract targeted molecules and internal standards from biological fluid in preparation for matrix assisted laser desorption ionization-time of flight mass spectrometry (MALDI-TOF-MS). This method allows for "top down" and "bottom up" analysis. This sensitive method allows for a new and improved process for detecting multiple antigens and antibodies in a single assay. This assay is also capable of distinguishing mass shifted forms of the same molecule via a panantibody, as well as distinguish point mutations in proteins. Each specific form is detected uniquely based on their characteristic molecular mass. MSIA has dual specificity because of the antibody-antigen reaction coupled with the power of a mass spectrometer.

There are various other immunoassy techniques that have been used previously such as radioimmunoassay (RIA) and enzyme immunoassay (EIA and ELISA). These techniques are extremely sensitive however, there are many limitations to these methods. For example, quantification for ELISA and EIA require several hours because the binding has to reach equilibrium. RIA's disadvantage is that you need radioactive particles which are universally known to be carcinogens.

The creation of MSIA fulfilled the need to determine the presence of one or more antigens in a specimen as well as the quantification of those said species.

== History ==
This assay was patented in 2006 by Randall Nelson, Peter Williams and Jennifer Reeve Krone. The idea first came about with the development of ELISA and RIA. An earlier patent method suggested tagging antigens or antibodies with stable isotopes or long-lived radioactive elements. But limitations to both methods called for a better detection methods of a protein or proteins. The invention combines antigen-antibody binding with a mass spectrometer which aids in identifying qualitatively and quantifying analytes respectively.

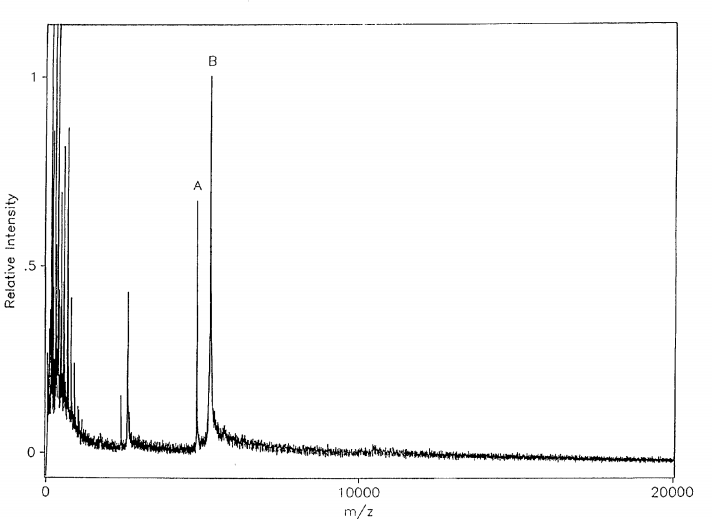
Mass spectrum generated using mass spectrometric immunoassay

An early MSIA experiment was done on a venom laced human blood sample for the Antigen myotoxin. The experiment was successful in that the mass spectrum resulting from the analysis showed a distinct response for myotoxin at the molecular weight corresponding to 4,822 Da (a). The m/z ratio at 5,242 Da (b) is the molecular weight of the modified variant H-myotoxina, used as an internal reference species. The figure of the mass spectrum is shown below.

== Methodology ==
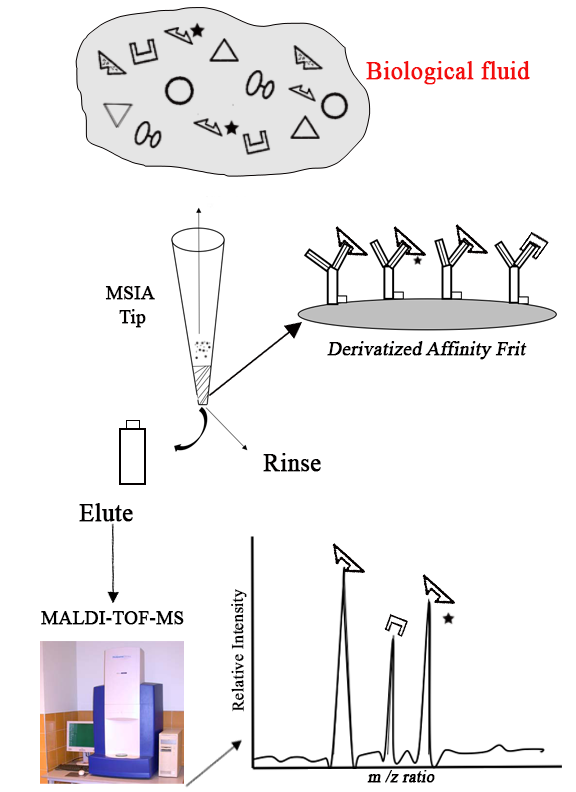
schematic of the general procedure used for mass spectrometric immunoassays.

An illustration of the MSIA procedure is depicted in the figure to the right. Analytes in a biological liquid sample are collected from solution by using a MSIA tip (also known as MSIA microcolumns) that contains a derivatized affinity frit. Biological samples contain various proteins that span a wide dynamic range so purification is needed to minimize the complex matrix and maximize mass spectrometry sensitivity. the MSIA tip serves as a place to purify these samples by immobilizing the analyte with high selectivity and specificity. Analytes are bound to the frit based on their affinities and all other nonspecific molecules are rinsed away. The specific targets are then eluted on to a mass spectrometer target plate with a MALDI matrix. However, proteins may be digested prior to ms analysis. A MALDI-TOF-MS later follows and targeted analytes are detected based on their m/z values. This method is qualitative, but the addition of mass shifted variants of the analyte for use as an internal standard makes this method useful for quantitative analysis.

Pipetor tips, which have been termed MSIA tips or affinity pipette tips play a key role in the process of detecting analytes within biological samples. MSIA tips typically contain porous solid support which has derivatized antigens or antibodies covalently attached. Different analytes have different affinity for the tips so it is necessary to derivatize MSIA tips based on the analyte of interest. The main use of these tips are to flow samples through and the analytes affinity for the bound antigen/antibody allows for the capture of analyte. Non specifically bound compounds are rinsed out of the MSIA tips.

The process can be simplified into 6 simple steps which Thermo termed the "work flow".

1. Gather Sample
2. Load Affinity Ligand
3. Purify Target Analyte
4. Elute Target Analyte
5. Pre-MS Sampling Process
6. MS Analysis

Many "work flows" are commercially available for purchase.

== Applications ==
MSIA is a method that can be used as an assay for a variety of different molecules such as proteins, hormones, drugs, toxins, and various pathogens found in biological fluids (Human and animal plasma, saliva, urine, tears etc.). MSIA has also been applied to clinical samples and have been proven to be a unique assay for clinically relevant proteins. Successfully assaying toxins, drugs and other pathogens are important to the environment as well as the human body. MSIA can be used for a range of biomedical and environmental applications.

An important application of mass spectrometric immunoassy is that it can be used as a rapid, sensitive and accurate screening of apolipoproteins and mutations of them. Apolipoproteins represent a groups of proteins with many functions such as transport and clearance as well as enzyme activation. Recent studies have claimed that mutations in apopliproteins result in, or assist in the progression of various associated diseases including amyloidosis, amyloid cardiomyopathy, Alzheimer's disease, hypertriglyceridemic, lowered cholesterol, hyperlipidemia and atherosclerosis to name a few. Nelson and colleagues did a study using MSIA to characterize and isolate apolipoproteins species.

== Benefits ==
There are many benefits to using a mass spectrometric immunoassay. Most importantly, the assay is extremely fast and the data are reproducible, and automated. They are sensitive, precise and allows for absolute quantification. Analytes can be detected to low detection limits (as low as picomolar) and the assay covers a wide dynamic range.

== See also ==
- Immunoassay
- Immunoscreening
- SISCAPA
