= SAA4 =

Protein-coding gene in the species Homo sapiens

Identifiers
- Aliases: SAA4, C-SAA, CSAA, serum amyloid A4, constitutive
- External IDs: OMIM: 104752; MGI: 98224; GeneCards: SAA4; OMA:SAA4 - orthologs

Gene location (Human)
Chr.	Chromosome 11 (human)
Band	11p15.1	Start	18,231,355 bp
Band	11p15.1	End	18,236,802 bp

Gene location (Mouse)
Chr.	Chromosome 7 (mouse)
Band	7 B3|7 30.53 cM	Start	46,377,422 bp
Band	7 B3|7 30.53 cM	End	46,382,027 bp
RNA expression pattern
Bgee	Human / Mouse (ortholog); Top expressed in: right lobe of liver; olfactory zone of nasal mucosa; minor salivary glands; lactiferous gland; anterior pituitary; Descending thoracic aorta; tonsil; gastrocnemius muscle; appendix; gallbladder / Top expressed in: left lobe of liver; gallbladder; human fetus; thoracic diaphragm; ureter; proximal tubule; lower limb muscles; yolk sac; muscle of leg; medial head of gastrocnemius muscle; More reference expression data
BioGPS	n/a
Gene ontology
Molecular function	chemoattractant activity
Cellular component	extracellular region; extracellular exosome; high-density lipoprotein particle; extracellular space
Biological process	cell chemotaxis; acute-phase response; positive chemotaxis
Sources:Amigo / QuickGO
Orthologs
Species	Human	Mouse
Entrez	6291	20211
Ensembl	ENSG00000148965	ENSMUSG00000040017
UniProt	P35542	P31532
RefSeq (mRNA)	NM_006512	NM_011316
RefSeq (protein)	NP_006503	NP_035446
Location (UCSC)	Chr 11: 18.23 – 18.24 Mb	Chr 7: 46.38 – 46.38 Mb
PubMed search
- Wikidata
View/Edit Human	View/Edit Mouse

Serum amyloid A4, constitutive is a protein that in humans is encoded by the SAA4 gene.
