= NeXtProt =

neXtProt

Content
- Description: neXtProt: exploring the universe of human proteins
- Data types captured: Protein annotation
- Organisms: Human

Contact
- Research center: Swiss Institute of Bioinformatics
- Laboratory: CALIPHO
- Primary citation: Gaudet, et al. (2016)

Access
- Website: www.nextprot.org

Tools
- Web: Search, BLAST, SNORQL

Miscellaneous
- License: Creative Commons Attribution 4.0
- Versioning: Yes
- Data release frequency: Data: 3 times per year
- Curation policy: Yes - manual and automatic
- Bookmarkable entities: Yes - individual protein entries views and searches

neXtProt is an on-line knowledge platform on human proteins. It strives to be a comprehensive resource that provides a variety of types of information on human proteins, such as their function, subcellular location, expression, interactions and role in diseases. The major part of the information in neXtProt is obtained from the UniProt Swiss-Prot database but it is complemented by data originating from high-throughput studies with an emphasis on proteomics. neXtProt offers also an advanced search capacity based on the SPARQL technology as well as an API that allows to programmatically extract the data stored in the resource. It is developed by the CALIPHO group directed by Amos Bairoch and Lydie Lane of the Swiss Institute of Bioinformatics (SIB).
