= Human Protein Atlas =

Database of human proteins

Content
- Description: The Human Protein Atlas portal is a publicly available database with millions of high-resolution images showing the spatial distribution of proteins in normal human tissues and different cancer types, as well the sub cellular localisation in single cells.
- Organisms: Human

Contact
- Research center: KTH, UU, SciLifeLab, Sweden
- Primary citation: Uhlén M, et al. (January 2015). "Proteomics. Tissue-based map of the human proteome". Science. 347 (6220) 1260419. doi:10.1126/science.1260419. PMID 25613900. S2CID 802377.

Access
- Website: www.proteinatlas.org
- Download URL: www.proteinatlas.org/about/download

Tools
- Web: Advanced search, bulk retrieval/download

Miscellaneous
- Versioning: Yes
- Data release frequency: 12 months
- Version: 25.1
- Curation policy: Yes – manual
- Bookmarkable entities: Yes – both individual protein entries and searches

The Human Protein Atlas (HPA) is a Swedish-based program started in 2003 with the aim to map all the human proteins in cells, tissues and organs using integration of various omics technologies, including antibody-based imaging, mass spectrometry-based proteomics, transcriptomics and systems biology. All the data in the knowledge resource is open access to allow scientists both in academia and industry to freely access the data for exploration of the human proteome. In May 2026, version 25.1 was launched where Deep Visual Proteomics (DVP) data was included in the Single cell resource.

The atlas now includes nine separate resources with complementary information about all human proteins. All data has been updated on the approximately 5 million individual web pages. The Human Protein Atlas program has already contributed to several thousands of publications in the field of human biology and disease and was selected by the organization ELIXIR as a European core resource due to its fundamental importance for a wider life science community as well as recognized as a Global Core Biodata Resource. The HPA consortium is funded by the Knut and Alice Wallenberg Foundation.

== The nine resources ==
The Human Protein Atlas consists of nine resources:

1. The Tissue resource of the Human Protein Atlas focuses on the expression profiles in human tissues of genes both on the mRNA and protein level. The protein expression data from 45 normal human tissue types is derived from antibody-based protein profiling using conventional and multiplex immunohistochemistry. All underlying images of immunohistochemistry stained normal tissues are available together with knowledge-based annotation of protein expression levels.
2. The Brain section provides comprehensive spatial profiling of the brain, including overview of protein expression in the mammalian brain based on integration of data from human, pig and mouse. Transcriptomics data combined with affinity-based protein in situ localization down to single cell detail is available in this brain-centric sub atlas of the Human Protein Atlas. The data presented are for human genes and their one-to-one orthologues in pig and mouse. Gene summary pages provide the hierarchical expression landscape form 13 main regions of the brain to individual nuclei and subfields for every protein coding gene. For selected proteins, high content images are available to explore the cellular and subcellular protein distribution. In addition, the Brain section contains lists of genes with elevated expression in one or a group of regions to help the user identify unique protein expression profiles linked to physiology and function.
3. The Single Cell resource presents comprehensive data on gene expression across various human tissues and cell types, utilizing single cell RNA sequencing (scRNAseq), cell sorting, single nuclei RNA sequencing (snRNAseq), Deep Visual Proteomics (based on mass spectrometry), and bulk RNAseq correlation analyses. The resource provides insights into mRNA and protein expression patterns, gene specificity, and expression clustering with single cell types, immune cells and brain single nuclei. The Single Cell Resource includes five main datasets: - The Single cell type section, providing the expression profiles across 154 cell types from 34 human tissues, and cell type specificity based on gene expression. - The Deep Visual Proteomics section, providing protein detection in 27 cell types from 14 tissue types - The Tissue cell type section, providing the predicted cell-type expression specificity based on bulk RNAseq - The Single nuclei brain section, providing more details regarding cell type specificity within the brain, based on single nuclei RNAseq - The Immune cell section, providing expression comparison between sorted immune cells
4. The Cancer resource is based on mRNA expression data from 21 cancer types as well as protein data from 20 cancers analyzed by IHC and 11 cancer types analyzed using MS. This data is displayed together with millions of in-house generated immunohistochemically stained tissue sections images and Kaplan-Meier plots showing the correlation between mRNA expression of each human protein gene and cancer patient survival.
5. The Blood resource focus on the individual protein levels in blood of both healthy individuals and patients diagnosed with various diseases. Here you can explore: - The individual protein levels in blood from healthy individuals and patients diagnosed with diseases. - The longitudinal blood protein levels in healthy individuals during two years. - The longitudinal blood protein levels in children through puberty. - The effect of age, BMI and sex on the individual protein levels in blood. - The levels of plasma proteins using immune assays and mass spectrometry.
6. The Subcellular resource of the Human Protein Atlas provides high-resolution insights into the expression and spatiotemporal distribution of proteins encoded by 13603 genes (67% of the human protein-coding genes) as well as predictions for an additional 3459 secreted- or membrane proteins, covering a total of 17062 genes (85% of the human protein-coding genes). For each gene, the subcellular distribution of the protein has been investigated by immunofluorescence (ICC-IF) and confocal microscopy in up to three different cell lines, selected from a panel of 42 cell lines used in the subcellular resource. Upon image analysis, the subcellular localization of the protein has been classified into one or more of 35 different organelles and fine subcellular structures. For some genes, the protein has also been stained in up to three ciliated cell lines, induced pluripotent stem cells (iPSCs) and/or in human sperm cells. Upon image analysis, the subcellular localization of the protein has been classified into one or more of 49 different organelles and subcellular structures. In addition, the resource includes an annotation of genes that display single-cell variation in protein expression levels and/or subcellular distribution, as well as an extended analysis of cell cycle dependency of such variations.
7. The Cell Line resource contains information on genome-wide RNA expression profiles of human protein-coding genes in 1206 human cell lines, including 1132 cancer cell lines. The transcriptomics analysis includes classification based on specificity analysis across 28 cancer types, distribution and expression cluster analysis across all cell lines and for selected cancer types also analysis of similarity of the cell lines to their corresponding cancer type.
8. The Structure resource contains information about the predicted three-dimensional structure of 19904 human proteins and their related isoforms. Interactive 3D protein structures based on predictions generated using the AlphaFold source code are shown with the possibility to highlight selected regions and positions in the structure. The Protein Browser tool displays a variety of features for the different isoforms and can be used to select splice variants and highlight protein related features such as known antigen sequences, transmembrane regions and InterPro domains directly on the structures. The amino acid positions of population variants and variants with known clinical relevance in the Ensembl Variation database as well as predicted benign and pathological variants from AlphaMissense can also be displayed..
9. The Interaction resource focuses on various aspects of human protein interactions, including reported experimental protein-protein interactions and their prediced three-dimensional structures as well as metabolic interactions and pathways. The data is based on external sources complemented with "in-house" analysis. Here you can explore: - Predicted 3D structures for consensus protein-protein interactions - Protein-protein interaction networks for most genes - Features such as subcellular location and expression specificity displayed on the interaction networks - Pathways/subsystems of metabolic genes and metabolic pathways from the Metabolic Atlas.

== Additional features ==
In addition to the twelve sections of HPA, exploring gene and protein expression, there are various features available at the HPA website to assist the research community, including integrated external resources, such as Metabolic Atlas, educational material and free downloadable data.

- The "Learn" section of HPA includes educational resources, including information regarding antibody-based applications and techniques, a histology dictionary and educational 3D videos. The dictionary is an interactive tool for free full-screen exploration of whole slide images of normal human organs and tissues, cancer tissues and cell structures, guided with detailed annotations of all major structural elements. Educational videos have been produced by HPA, depicting the exploration of the human body in 3D, using antibody-based profiling of tissues and light sheet microscopy. The movies are available at the HPA website as well as on a YouTube channel.
- Datasets used in HPA are made freely available to encourage further studies within the research community. Access to the extensive datasets is given through the downloadable data page of HPA, wherein 29 different downloadable files are available, containing genome‐wide data across various assays.

== History ==
The Human Protein Atlas program was started in 2003 and funded by the non-profit organization Knut and Alice Wallenberg Foundation (KAW). The main site of the project is the Royal Institute of Technology (KTH), School of Engineering Sciences in Chemistry, Biotechnology and Health (Stockholm, Sweden). Additionally, the project involves research groups at Uppsala University, Karolinska Institutet, Chalmers University of Technology and Lund University, as well as several present and past international collaborations initiated with research groups in Europe, the United States, South Korea, China, and India. Professor Mathias Uhlén is the director of the program.

The research underpinning the start of the exploration of the whole human proteome in the Human Protein Atlas program was carried out in the late 1990s and early 2000s. A pilot study employing an affinity proteomics strategy using affinity-purified antibodies raised against recombinant human protein fragments was carried out for a chromosome-wide protein profiling of chromosome 21. Other projects were also carried out to establish processes for parallel and automated affinity purification of mono-specific antibodies and their validation.

== Research ==
Antibodies and antigens, produced in the Human Protein Atlas workflow, are used in research projects to study potential biomarkers in various diseases, such as breast cancer, prostate cancer, colon cancer, diabetes, autoimmune diseases, ovarian cancer and renal failure.

Researchers involved with Human Protein Atlas projects, are sharing protocols and method details in an open-access group on protocols.io. A large effort is put into validating the antibody reagents used for profiling of tissues and cells, and the HPA has implemented stringent antibody validation criteria as suggested by the International Working Group for Antibody Validation (IWGAV).

== Collaborations ==
The Human Protein Atlas program has participated in 9 EU research projects ENGAGE, PROSPECTS, BIO_NMD, AFFINOMICS, CAGEKID, EURATRANS, ITFoM, DIRECT and PRIMES.

== See also ==
- Expression Atlas
- The Cancer Genome Atlas
