= Akhilesh Pandey =

American proteomicist

- Education: Armed Forces Medical College; University of Michigan; Whitehead Institute; University of Southern Denmark; Massachusetts Institute of Technology
- Scientific career
- Fields: Proteomics; Mass Spectrometry
- Workplaces: Johns Hopkins University; Mayo Clinic; Institute of Bioinformatics

Akhilesh Pandey is an Indian-American proteomicist and a Professor at Department of Laboratory Medicine and Pathology, Center for Individualized Medicine of Mayo Clinic in Rochester, Minnesota, USA. He is also the founding director and chief scientific advisor of the Institute of Bioinformatics in Bangalore, India.

== Education ==
Pandey earned his medical degree from Armed Forces Medical College in Pune and completed his pathology residency at Brigham and Women's Hospital, Harvard Medical School in Boston, Massachusetts. He received his Ph.D. in Molecular Biology from the University of Michigan in Ann Arbor, Michigan, USA. He was a Postdoctoral Fellow in Harvey Lodish's laboratory at the Whitehead Institute for Biomedical Research at the Massachusetts Institute of Technology in Cambridge, Massachusetts. He was a Visiting Scientist in Matthias Mann's group at the University of Southern Denmark.

== Career ==
For 16 years, he was a Professor at the Johns Hopkins University School of Medicine's McKusick-Nathans Institute of Genetic Medicine and the Departments of Biological Chemistry, Oncology, and Pathology. In 2002, he founded the Institute of Bioinformatics (IOB) in Bangalore, India.

IOB's work on a virtually complete protein map of humans was featured on the cover of the Nature's volume in May 2014, with the title "The Human Proteome." The DST of the Government of India published "India's Research Landscape: Output, Collaboration, and Comparative Performance - Bibliometric Studies" on February 17, 2016, which contained two reports. The first study, "India's Research Output and Collaboration (2005–2014): A Bibliometric Study," was put together by Thomson Reuters, and the second, "International Comparative Performance of India's Research Base (2009–2014)," was put together independently by Elsevier. In the field of biology and biochemistry, the 2009 paper "Human Protein Reference Database" was ranked second among the top 10 publications with Indian affiliation, and the 2014 Nature cover article "A draft map of human proteome" was ranked sixth after receiving more than 400 citations in a short period of time.

== Awards and honours ==
Pandey has the Human Proteome Organization(HUPO)'s Discovery in Proteomic Sciences Award. The Wellcome Trust/DBT India Alliance named him a Margdarshi Fellow, and he established a Center for Molecular Medicine at NIMHANS in Bangalore as a result. He is an Associate Editor of Clinical Proteomics and a member of the Editorial Boards of Molecular and Cellular Proteomics, Proteomics, and the Journal of Clinical Investigation. He has received the Howard Temin Award from the National Cancer Institute, the Experimental Pathologist-In-Training Award from the American Society for Investigative Pathology, and the Sidney Kimmel Scholar Award from the Sidney Kimmel Foundation for Cancer Research. The United States Department of Defense also bestowed upon him the Era of Hope Scholar Award.
