= Soft Ionization by Chemical Reaction in Transfer =

Ionization Method

Soft Ionization by Chemical Reaction in Transfer is a method for ionizing small organic compounds at ambient atmospheric pressure. It is used for ion generation in mass spectrometers (MS).

The technique is often abbreviated as SICRIT, a trademark of Plasmion GmbH, which commercialized the technique in the 2020s.

== Ionization technique ==
Sicrit ionizes molecules through a technique known as dielectric barrier discharge. This process involves creating an electrical discharge between two electrodes that are separated by a dielectric. The electrodes are a stainless-steel tube placed inside a copper tube, with a thin quartz tube separating them. The sample containing the molecules to be ionized flows through the quartz tube separating the electrodes. A voltage is applied to the electrodes; the resulting electrical discharge ignites a cold plasma which ionizes the sample.

Unlike other ambient ionization methods such as DART, DAPPI or DESI, SICRIT takes place directly in line with the inlet system of the MS and thus in a continuous flow:

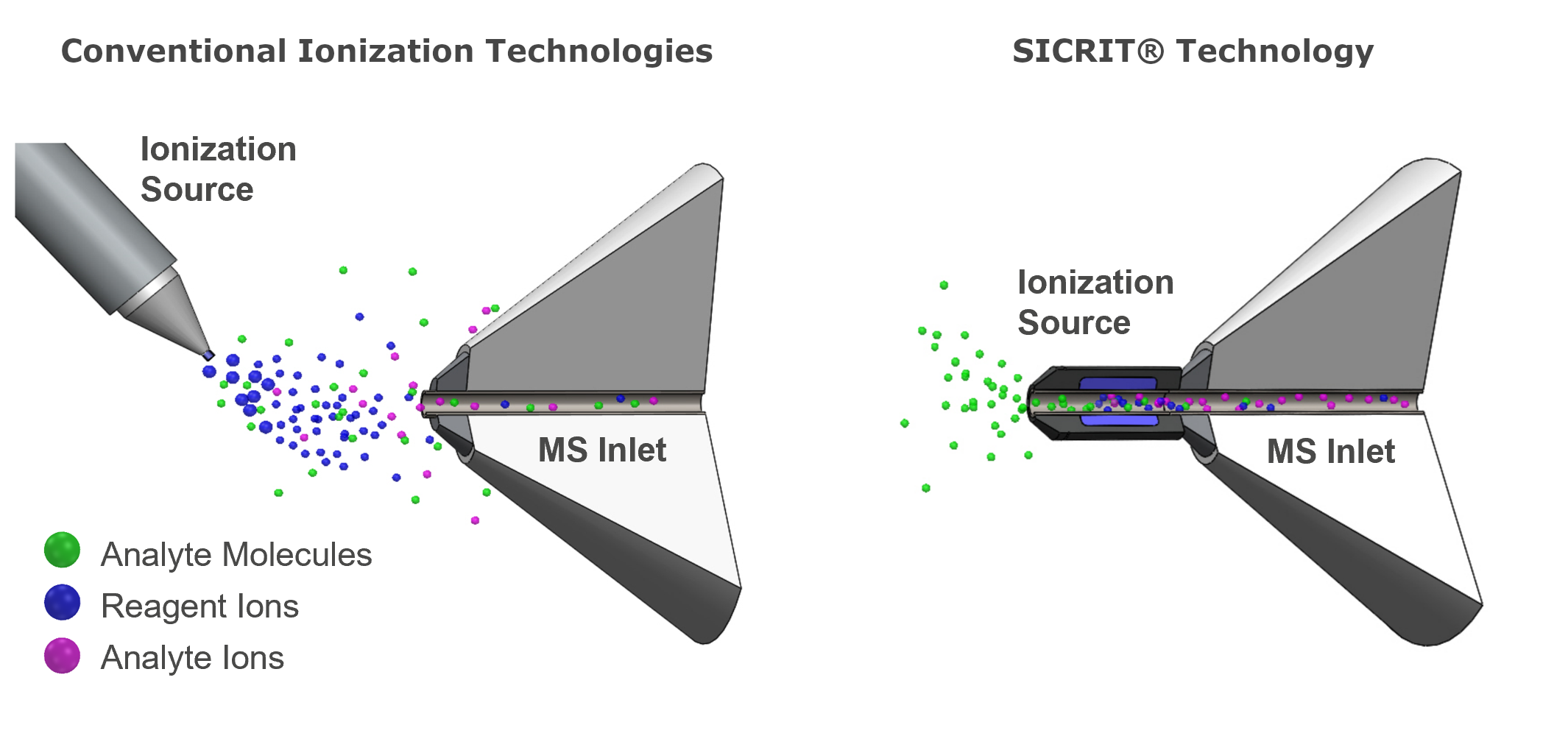
Conventional ionization technologies compared to the SICRIT technology

Several reaction pathways have been identified that lead to ionization during this process:

- The proton transfer via hydronium clusters, similar to spray-based methods (c. ESI).
- The hydronium cluster mechanism as with chemical methods (cf. APCI).
- The radical cation pathway: After an initial electron ionization of gas, solvent, and analyte, the formed radical cations are stabilized by abstraction of hydrogen atoms from other reactants, such as solvents, resulting mainly in a protonated molecule.
- A reaction pathway where charge transfer occurs through reactive species and UV radiation (photoionization).

Regardless of the specific reaction pathway, almost exclusively protonated species [M+H]+ are generated during ionization.

Since the analytes do not come into direct contact with the plasma during ionization, but rather charge transfer occurs via reactive species and UV radiation, the molecules remain intact and fragmentation is avoided. Consequently, SICRIT is a very "soft" ionization method.

== Characteristics ==
The SICRIT technology decouples sample delivery from the ionization process. Through the flow principle, the sample is directly drawn into the high vacuum behind the MS inlet and ionized on its way into the inlet. The electrode geometry is chosen so that, under the given physical parameters (pressure, ignition voltage, gas constant, see Paschen's law), flexibility regarding the plasma medium is ensured. This allows the generation of stable cold plasma even in ambient air. In the simplest application, ambient air can be directly analyzed.

Ionization in flow enables high ion transmission since ion loss is significantly reduced compared to the most commonly used spraying methods in mass spectrometry (cf. ESI, APCI). Consequently, this leads to an increase in sensitivity compared to these methods.

Ionization in flow also allows for real-time measurement without the need for sample preparation. Simple screening applications, especially for volatile organic compound analysis, can be easily implemented since the usual sample preparation (including crushing, extraction, purification, etc.) becomes obsolete for simple screening applications.

The different reaction pathways in plasma ionization broaden the spectrum of ionizable substances. This means that compared to ionization methods that only allow for single reaction pathways, a wider polarity range of analytes is covered, and nonpolar substances such as hexane can be ionized.

The low fragmentation ionization allows for identification based on the molecular mass as protonated [M+H]+ species. This can be particularly useful in combination with high-resolution mass spectrometers such as time-of-flight mass spectrometers (TOF-MS) or Orbitrap-MS for non-target analysis, where the entire substance spectrum of a sample is captured based on the exact mass of the molecules.

Thus, SICRIT can be used in combination with both liquid chromatography (LC) as well as gas chromatography (GC). This enables the performance of both LC-MS and GC-MS analyses on the same mass spectrometer and the establishment of a unified database for comparing data from these otherwise instrumentally separated separation and detection methods.

== Instruments and application ==
=== Direct screening ===
As ambient ionization, SICRIT technology enables direct, real-time gas phase measurement using a mass spectrometer. The sample is positioned directly in front of the SICRIT source without any preparation. One application area is the measurement of aromatic compounds.

=== Chromatography couplings ===
The SICRIT ion source allows for coupling with various types of chromatography (GC, HPLC, SFC, etc.) as interface technology to any atmospheric pressure mass spectrometer (LC-MS). The ionization with its characteristics (see above) is not influenced by the coupling, allowing the same ionization method to be used for different chromatography couplings. The ability to couple gas chromatography with a low-fragmentation ionization technique on an LC-MS, for example, can be utilized in the analysis of saturated hydrocarbons. Electron impact ionization commonly used in GC-MS leads to difficult-to-interpret fragmentation spectra, while plasma ionization provides fragmentation-free spectra. Thus, the DBD plasma with its broad ionization range opens up new fields of application possibilities for LC mass spectrometers in residue analysis, such as pesticides, where gas chromatographic separation is the method of choice and plasma ionization achieves very low detection limits.

=== Chemical imaging ===
In combination with appropriate sample preparation and instrumentation, the SICRIT ion source can also be used for imaging mass spectrometry. The standard procedure typically involves elaborate sample preparation combined with laser desorption/ionization (e.g., MALDI or atmospheric pressure MALDI), allowing spatial visualization of biomolecules, for example, in tissue sections.

The use of the SICRIT source for additional in-line post-ionization in AP-MALDI experiments can result in significant signal enhancement in the detection of metabolites in biological sample material or enables detection of small (bio)molecules that are not addressable using MALDI alone.

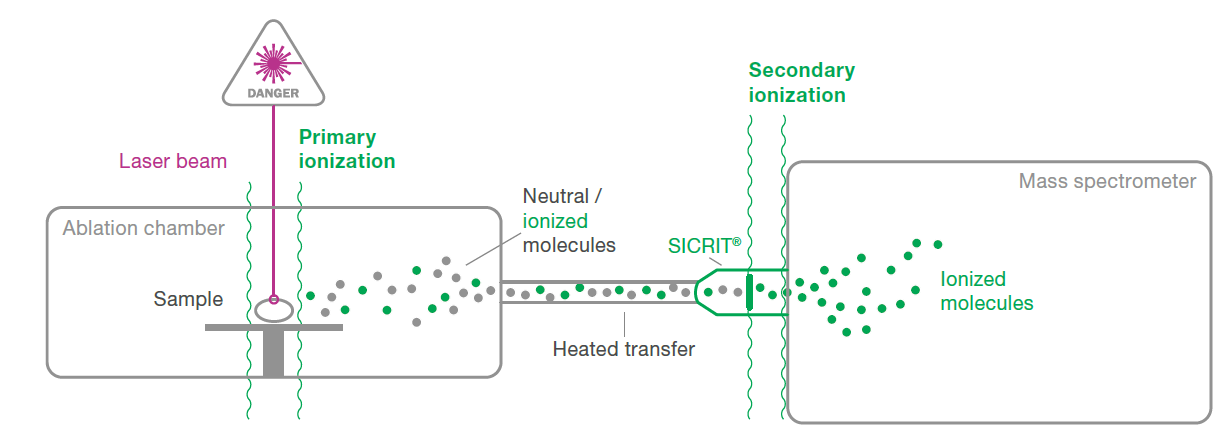
Figure 2: MS Imaging with SICRIT Post-Ionization after AP-MALDI

Furthermore, the SICRIT ion source enables spatially resolved analysis of unprepared samples in laser ablation experiments (cf. Fig. 3). The analytes released by laser bombardment are ionized directly with the SICRIT ion source, and the spatially resolved data are translated into two-dimensional images. This provides information, for example, on the distribution of active ingredients in tablets.

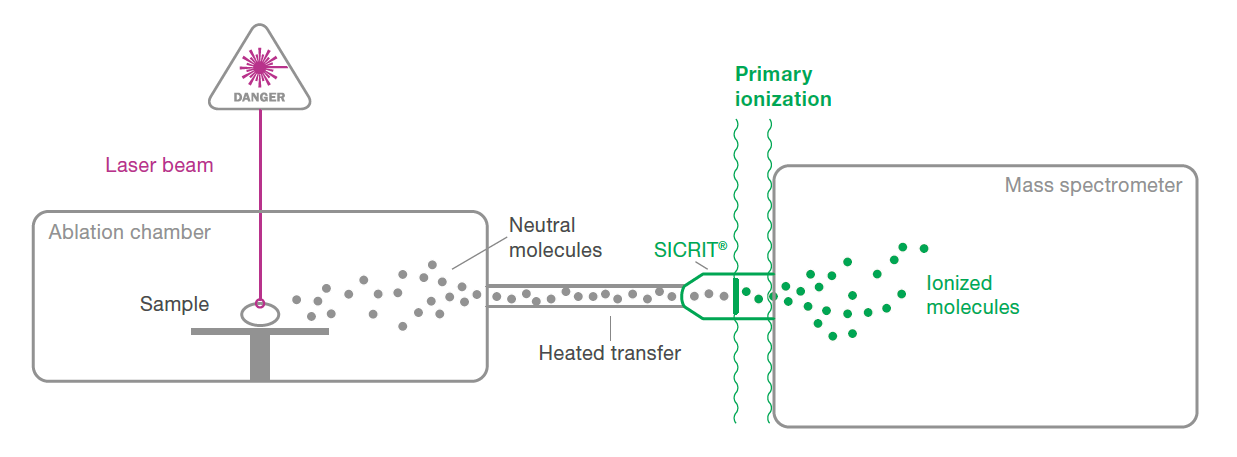
Figure 3: MS Imaging with SICRIT Post-Ionization after High-Resolution Laser Ablation

=== Cell analysis ===
In combination with a flow cytometer, the SICRIT ion source also enables the analysis of individual cells. The separated cell is introduced into the mass spectrometer through the ion source, and the lysate released upon cell rupture is analyzed. More precisely, the molecules contained in the lysate (mostly lipids) are ionized.
