= Extractive electrospray ionization =

Ambient ionization source

Extractive Electrospray Ionization (EESI)
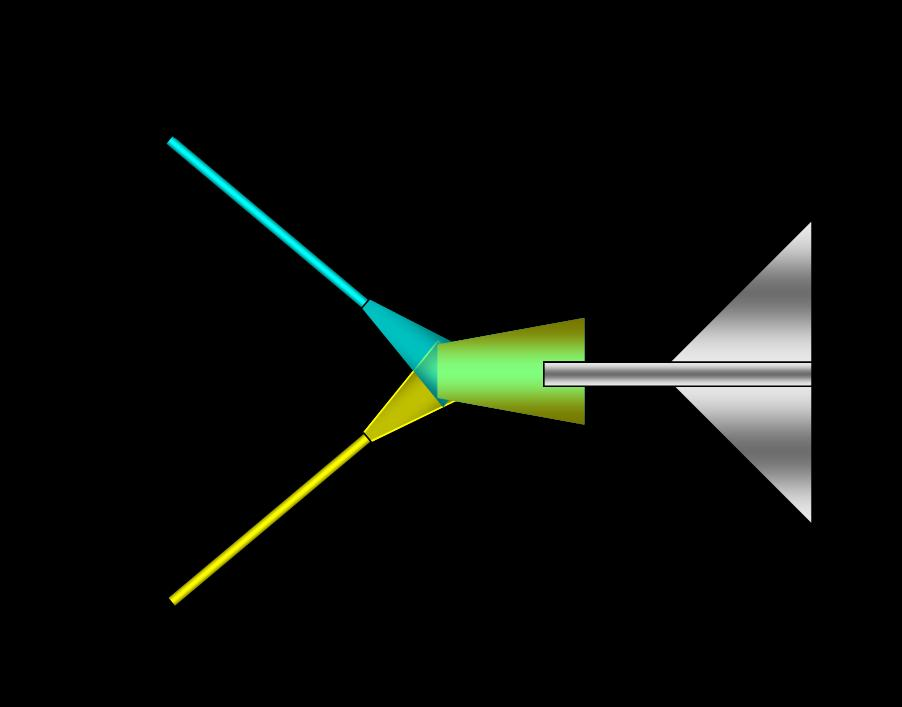
- Schematic of extractive electrospray
- Acronym: EESI
- Classification: Mass spectrometry
- Analytes: Organic molecules Biomolecules

Other techniques
- Related: Desorption electrospray ionization Electrospray ionization Atmospheric pressure chemical ionization ambient ionization mass spectrometry Desorption atmospheric pressure photoionization

Extractive electrospray ionization (EESI) is a spray-type, ambient ionization source in mass spectrometry that uses two colliding aerosols, one of which is generated by electrospray. In standard EESI, syringe pumps provide the liquids for both an electrospray and a sample spray. In neutral desorption EESI (ND-EESI), the liquid for the sample aerosol is provided by a flow of nitrogen.

== Principle of operation ==
A ND-EESI experiment is simple in concept and implementation. A room temperature (20 °C) nitrogen gas stream is flowed through a narrow opening (i.d.~0.1 mm) to form a sharp jet targeted at a surface. The nitrogen molecules desorb analytes from the surface. The jet is only 2–3 mm above the surface, and the gas flow is about 200 mL/min with gas speeds around 300 m/s. The sample area is about 10 mm^{2}. An optional enclosure, most commonly made of glass, can cover the sampling area to ensure proper positioning of the gas jet and the sample transfer line. A tube carries the neutral aerosol to the ESI spray.

The sample spray in EESI produces a liquid aerosol with the analyte in sample droplets. The ESI spray produces droplets with protons. The sample droplets and the proton-rich droplets bump into each other. Each droplet has properties: analyte solubility in the ESI spray solvent and surface tension of the spray solution and of the sample solution. With dissimilar properties, some collisions produce no extraction because the droplets “bounce", but with similar properties, some collisions produce coalescence and liquid-liquid extraction. The extent of the extraction depends on the similarity of the properties.

== Applications ==
Ambient ionization techniques are attractive for many samples for their high tolerance to complex mixtures and for fast testing. EESI has been employed for the rapid characterization of living objects, native proteins, and metabolic biomarkers.

EESI has been applied to food samples, urine, serum, exhaled breath and protein samples. A general investigation of urine, serum, milk and milk powders was reported in 2006. Breath analysis of valproic acid with EESI was reported in 2007. The maturity of fruit was classified with the combination of EESI and principal component analysis, and live samples were tested a short time later. Perfumes were classified with the combination of EESI and characteristic ions. On-line monitoring was performed in 2008. Melamine in tainted milk was detected in 2009. Breath analysis was performed with the combination of EESI and an ion trap mass spectrometer. Beverages, over-the-counter drugs, uranyl waste water, and aquiculture water were tested with EESI between 2010 and 2016.

== See also ==
- Secondary electrospray ionization
- Tandem mass spectrometry
