= Probe electrospray ionization =

Probe electrospray ionization (PESI) is an electrospray-based ambient ionization technique which is coupled with mass spectrometry for sample analysis. Unlike traditional mass spectrometry ion sources which must be maintained in a vacuum, ambient ionization techniques permit sample ionization under ambient conditions, allowing for the high-throughput analysis of samples in their native state, often with minimal or no sample pre-treatment. The PESI ion source simply consists of a needle to which a high voltage is applied following sample pick-up, initiating electrospray directly from the solid needle.

== History ==
Probe electrospray ionization is an ambient ionization mass spectrometry technique developed by Kenzo Hiraoka et al. at the University of Yamanashi, Japan. The technique was developed to address some of the issues associated with traditional electrospray ionization (ESI), including clogging of the capillary and contamination, whilst providing a means of rapid and direct sample analysis. Since its initial conception, various modified forms of the PESI ion source have been developed, and the PESI-MS system has been commercialized by instrument manufacturing company Shimadzu.

== Principle of operation ==
The PESI ion source consists of a solid needle or wire which acts as both the sampling probe and electrospray emitter. The needle is moved up and down along a vertical axis, a process which can be either automated or manual. When the needle is lowered to the sampling stage, the tip of the needle briefly touches the surface of a typical liquid sample. During this stage, the needle is held at ground potential. The needle is then raised to be level with the mass spectrometer inlet where a high voltage of 2–3 kV is applied. Electrospray is induced at the tip of the needle, producing analyte ions which are drawn into the mass spectrometer for analysis. The mechanism by which ions are formed is believed to be identical to traditional electrospray ionization. As a result, in positive ion mode analytes are often observed as the protonated, sodiated and potentiated ions, depending on the sample and analyte type.

Probe electrospray ionization (PESI) schematic

Although the amount of sample picked up by the needle is largely dependent on sample viscosity, it has been estimated that just a few picolitres of the sample solution are typically used.

Because of this, the technique can be applied to small sample sizes, particularly ideal when limited sample amounts are available. As such a small sample amount is picked up and completely exhausted during the ionization process, issues of contamination are severely reduced. Furthermore, the process of sampling and ionization takes just a few seconds, so PESI-MS is suitable for high-throughput analysis.

=== Sequential ionization ===
A phenomenon observed with probe electrospray ionization is the sequential and exhaustive ionization of analytes with different surface activities. During the development of PESI, it was discovered that analytes could be sequentially ionized throughout the electrospray, thus enabling a temporal separation of components within a sample. In normal ESI, the sample solution is typically continuously supplied through a capillary and the charged droplets contain all sample components, with more surface-active analytes being constantly preferentially ionized. In PESI, surface-active analytes are also preferentially ionized. However, as a finite droplet exists on the tip of the needle, following the depletion of surface-active analytes, the remaining components in the droplet can then be ionized and observed. This can result in the production of distinctively different mass spectra from a single sample over the application of the high voltage for just a few seconds.

This effect offers a particular advantage in the analysis of analytes suffering from ion suppression effects. The presence of surface-active analytes or charged solvent additives can result in the suppressed ionization of analytes of interest, resulting in low sensitivity or the complete absence of the analyte. The effects of ion suppression can be minimized by reducing the complexity of the sample, for instance through sample extraction techniques such as solid phase extraction, or by separation of analytes of interest using chromatographic separation. However, these sample preparation steps can be laborious, time-consuming and expensive. PESI enables a reduction in ion suppression without the need for sample pre-treatment. By separating the ionization of different analytes, components causing ion suppression can be exhausted before enabling the ionization of components of interest. This has been demonstrated in a number of scenarios, including in the analysis of raw urine, with concentrated components such as creatinine ionization initially, followed by the appearance of previously undetected metabolites.

== Sheath-flow PESI ==
As the PESI needle is only applicable to liquid or penetrable solid samples, it cannot be used for the analysis of the majority of dry solid materials. To circumvent this limitation, sheath-flow probe electrospray ionization (sfPESI) was developed, a modification of the traditional PESI technique. The sfPESI ion source consists of a solid needle housed within a plastic sheath (typically a gel-loading tip) filled with a small amount of solvent. The needle protrudes from the base of the sheath by approximately 0.1 mm, where a minute solvent droplet is held. The based of based the probe is briefly touched to the sample surface, where a convex solvent meniscus forms between the probe and the sample, wetting the sample and enabling analyte extraction. The chemistry of the solvent can be modified to induce the extraction of particular analytes of interest. After application to the sample, the sfPESI probe is then raised to be level with the mass spectrometer inlet, with solubilised analytes held in the droplet at the tip of the needle, and a high voltage applied. sfPESI offers the same advantages as standard PESI, including the sequential and exhaustive ionization phenomenon, whilst enabling the direct analysis of dry samples.

== Applications ==
PESI-MS has proven to be particularly effective in the metabolic analysis of biological materials, having been applied to the analysis of cancerous and non-cancerous breast tissue, as well as brain and liver tissue removed from mice. Interestingly, PESI-MS has recently been applied to the direct analysis of living animals for real-time metabolic profiling. Due to the narrow diameter of the PESI needle and brief sample introduction time, PESI is reasonably non-invasive. As a result, the technique has been used to sample from the organs of living anaesthetized animals, specifically to analyse metabolites in the brain, spleen, liver and kidney of a living mouse. In addition to this, PESI-MS has been applied to the on-site analysis of food products for the purpose of quality control, to the detection of herbicides in body fluids to demonstrate exposure, and finally to the detection of illicit drugs in bodily fluids to indicate drug use. Several groups have also harnessed the small size of the PESI probe to achieve single-cell analysis, demonstrating the capability of rapidly detecting metabolites at cellular and subcellular levels.

The PESI modification known as sheath-flow PESI has been applied to the analysis of various solid samples in their native state, including pharmaceutical tablets, illicit drugs, food and agricultural products, and pesticides. In addition, sfPESI has been utilised in the field of forensic science for the analysis and identification of fresh and dried body fluids of forensic interest. In this work, sfPESI was also coupled with tandem mass spectrometry (MS/MS), demonstrating the capability of ion fragmentation for identification of unknown components.

== See also ==
- Ambient ionization
- Desorption electrospray ionization
- Electrospray ionization
