= Ambient ionization =

Formation of ions in a source outside a mass spectrometer

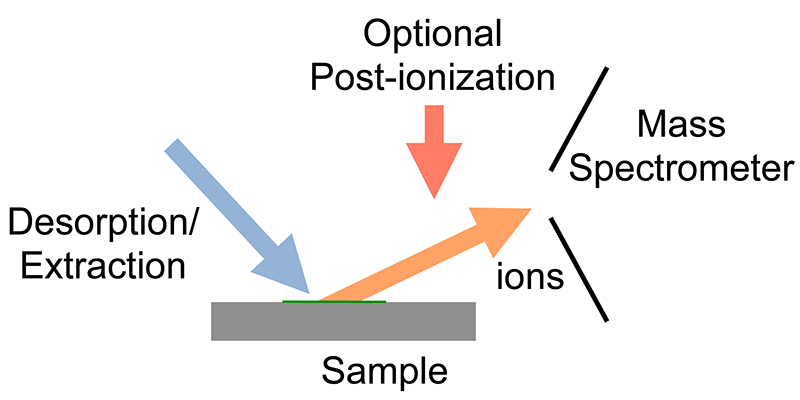
Diagram of ambient ionization in mass spectrometry indicating desorption/extraction (spray, heat, laser), optional post-ionization (electrospray, chemical ionization, plasma), ion formation, and entry into the vacuum of the mass spectrometer.

Ambient ionization is a form of ionization in which ions are formed in an ion source outside the mass spectrometer without sample preparation or separation. Ions can be formed by extraction into charged electrospray droplets, thermally desorbed and ionized by chemical ionization, or laser desorbed or ablated and post-ionized before they enter the mass spectrometer.

== Solid-liquid extraction ==
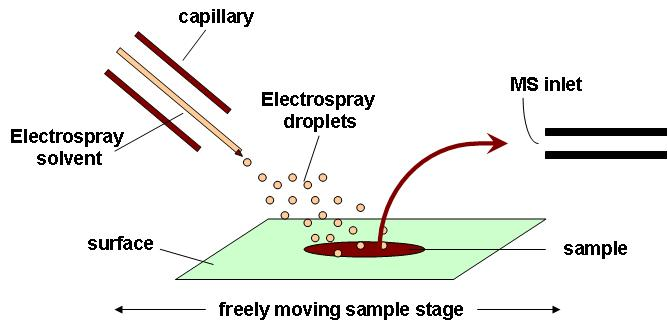
Schematic of a DESI solid-liquid extraction ion source: primary charged droplets hit the sample surface and molecules are extracted into the liquid. Secondary charged droplets removed from the surface produce bare ions as the solvent evaporates.

Solid-liquid extraction based ambient ionization is based on the use of a charged spray, for example electrospray to create a liquid film on the sample surface. Molecules on the surface are extracted into the solvent. The action of the primary droplets hitting the surface produces secondary droplets that are the source of ions for the mass spectrometer.

Desorption electrospray ionization (DESI) is one of the original ambient ionization sources and uses an electrospray source to create charged droplets that are directed at a solid sample. The charged droplets pick up the sample through interaction with the surface and then form highly charged ions that can be sampled into a mass spectrometer.

Desorption atmospheric pressure photoionization (DAPPI) is a solid-liquid extraction ambient ionization method that enables the direct analysis of samples deposited on surfaces by means of a jet of hot solvent vapour and ultraviolet light. The hot jet thermally desorbs the sample from a surface and the vaporized sample is ionized by a vacuum ultraviolet light and consequently sampled into a mass spectrometer.

== Plasma-based techniques ==
Plasma-based ambient ionization is based on an electrical discharge in a flowing gas that produces metastable atoms and molecules and reactive ions. Heat is often used to assist in the desorption of volatile species from the sample. Ions are formed by chemical ionization in the gas phase.

One proposed mechanism involves Penning ionization of ambient water clusters in a helium discharge:

$$\ce{He^\ast{} + [(H2O)_\mathit{n}H] ->{} [(H2O)_{\mathit n-1}H]+{} + OH^.{} + e^-}$$.

The protonated water clusters can then protonate the sample molecules via

$$\ce{[(H2O)_\mathit{n}H]+{} + M ->{} [M{} + H]+{} + \mathit{n}H2O}$$.

For this ionization pathway, the gas-phase acidity of the protonated water clusters and the gas-phase basicity of the analyte molecule are of crucial importance. However, since especially smaller protonated water clusters with n = 1,2,3... exhibit very high gas-phase acidities, even compounds with a rather low gas-phase basicity are readily ionized by proton transfer, yielding [M+H]^{+} quasimolecular ions.

Besides protonated water clusters, other positively charged reagent ions, such as NO^{+}, O_{2}^{+}, NO_{2}^{+} and CO_{2}^{+}, may be formed in the afterglow region. These additional reagent ions are capable of ionizing compounds via charge-transfer processes and, thus, offer alternative routes of ionization besides proton transfer, leading to a broader range of suitable analytes. Nevertheless, these ionization mechanisms may also lead to the formation of adducts and oxidation of the original analyte compounds.

Although most applications focus on the detection of positive ions, measurements in the negative mode are for most of the plasma-based ion sources also possible. In this case, reagent ions, such as O_{2}^{–}, can deprotonate the analyte molecules to give [M–H]^{–} quasimolecular ions, or form adducts with species such as NO_{3}^{–}, yielding [M+NO_{3}]^{–} ions. Measurements in the negative ion mode are especially favorable when the analyte molecules exhibit a high gas-phase acidity, as is the case for carboxylic acids.

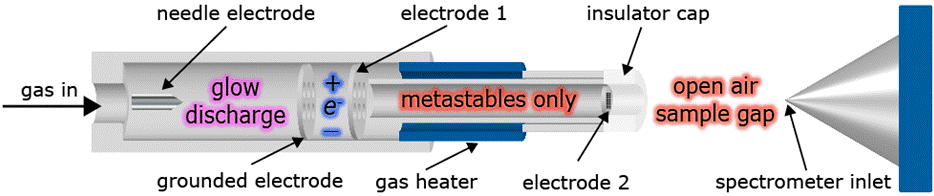
A direct analysis in real time (DART) metastable ion source for plasma based ambient ionization.

One of the most used plasma-based techniques for ambient ionization is probably direct analysis in real time (DART), since it is commercially available. DART is an atmospheric pressure ion source that operates by exposing the sample to a gas stream (typically helium or nitrogen) that contains long-lived electronically or excited neutral atoms, vibronically excited molecules (or "metastables"). Excited states are formed in a glow discharge in a chamber through which the gas flows.

== Laser assisted ==
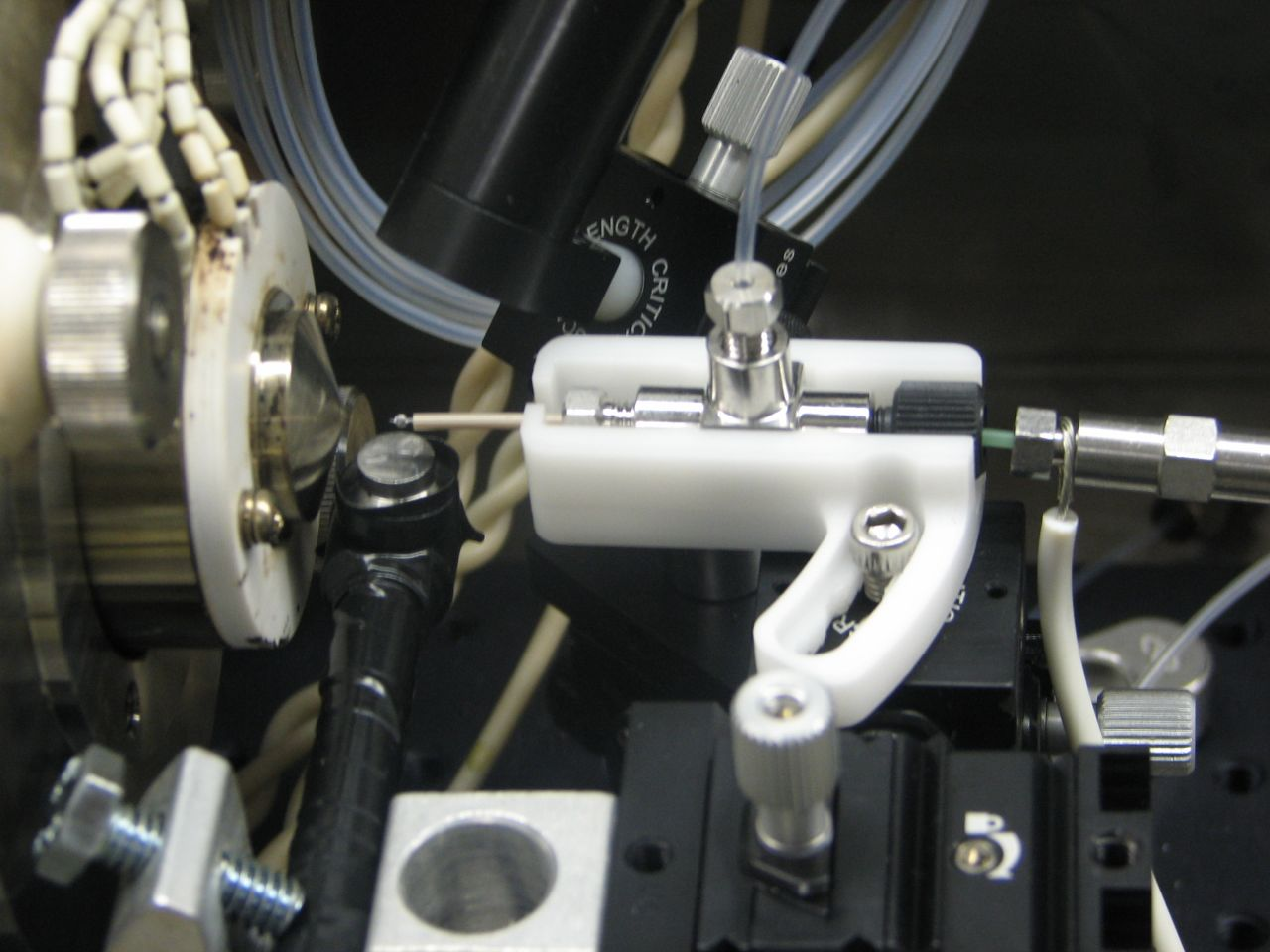
Ion source for ambient mass spectrometry employing a combination of laser desorption and electrospray. The sample target is on the left.

Laser-based ambient ionization is a two-step process in which a pulsed laser is used to desorb or ablate material from a sample and the plume of material interacts with an electrospray or plasma to create ions. Lasers with ultraviolet and infrared wavelengths and nanosecond to femtosecond pulse widths have been used. Although atmospheric pressure MALDI is performed under ambient conditions, it is not generally considered to be an ambient mass spectrometry technique.

Laser ablation was first coupled with mass spectrometry in the 1980s for the analysis of metals using laser ablation inductively coupled plasma mass spectrometry (LA-ICPMS). The laser ablates the sample material that is introduced into an ICP to create atomic ions.

Probe electrospray ionization schematic

Infrared laser desorption can be coupled with atmospheric pressure chemical ionization using laser desorption atmospheric pressure chemical ionization (LD-APCI). For ambient ionization with a spray, the sample material is deposited on a target near the spray. The laser desorbs or ablates material from the sample that is ejected from the surface and into the spray, which can be an APCI spray with a corona discharge or an electrospray. Ambient ionization by electrospray-assisted laser desorption/ionization (ELDI) can be accomplished with ultraviolet and infrared lasers to the desorb material into the electrospray plume. Similar approaches to laser desorption/ablation into an electrospray are matrix-assisted laser desorption electrospray ionization (MALDESI), laser ablation electrospray ionization (LAESI), laser assisted desorption electrospray ionization (LADESI), laser desorption electrospray ionization (LDESI), laser ablation mass spectrometry (LAMS), and laser desorption spray post-ionization (LDSPI). The term laser electrospray mass spectrometry has been used to denote the use of a femtosecond laser for ablation. Laser ablation into an electrospray produces highly charged ions that are similar to those observed in direct electrospray.

An alternative ionization approach following laser desorption is a plasma. UV laser ablation can be combined with a flowing afterglow plasma for mass spectrometry imaging of small molecules. and IR desorption has been combined with a metastable ion source.

== Two step non-laser ==
In two-step non-laser methods, the material removal from the sample and the ionization steps are separate.

Probe electrospray ionization (PESI) is a modified version of conventional electrospray ionization in which the capillary for sample solution transferring is replaced by a solid needle with a sharp tip. Compared with conventional electrospray ionization, high salt tolerance, direct sampling, and low sample consumption are found with PESI. PESI is not a continuous process; the needle for sampling and spraying is driven up and down at a frequency of 3–5 Hz.

== Vapor-ion, charge transfer reaction ==
The analytes are in the vapor phase. This includes breath, odors, VOCs, and other molecules with low volatility that, due to the constant improvements in sensitivity, are detectable in the vapor phase despite their low vapor pressure. Analyte ions are produced via gas-phase chemical reactions, where charging agents collide with the analyte molecules and transfer their charge. In secondary electro-spray ionization (SESI), a nano-electrospray operated at high temperature produces nanodroplets that evaporate very rapidly to produce ions and protonated water clusters that ionize the vapors of interest. SESI is commonly used for the analysis of trace concentrations of vapors being able to detect low volatility species in the gas phase with molecular masses of up to 700 Da.

== Table of techniques ==
In the table below, ambient ionization techniques are classified in the categories "extraction" (a solid or liquid extraction processes dynamically followed by spray or chemical ionization), "plasma" (thermal or chemical desorption with chemical ionization), "two step" (desorption or ablation followed by ionization), "laser" (laser desorption or ablation followed by ionization), "acoustic" (acoustic desorption followed by ionization), multimode (involving two of the above modes), other (techniques that do not fit into the other categories).

| Acronym | Technique | Classification |
|---|---|---|
| AFAI | Air flow-assisted ionization | Extraction |
| AFADESI | Air flow-assisted desorption electrospray ionization | Extraction |
| APGDDI | Atmospheric pressure glow discharge desorption ionization | Plasma |
| APPIS | Ambient pressure pyroelectric ion source | |
| APTDCI | Atmospheric pressure thermal desorption chemical ionization | Two-step |
| APTDI | Atmospheric pressure thermal desorption/ionization | Plasma |
| ASAP | Atmospheric pressure solids analysis probe | Plasma |
| BADCI | Beta electron-assisted direct chemical ionization | Two step |
| CALDI | Charge assisted laser desorption/ionization | Laser |
| DAPCI | Desorption atmospheric pressure chemical ionization | Plasma |
| DAPPI | Desorption atmospheric pressure photoionization | Extraction |
| DART | Direct analysis in real time | Plasma |
| DBDI | Dielectric barrier discharge ionization | Plasma |
| DCBI | Desorption corona beam ionization | Plasma |
| DCI | Desorption chemical ionization | Plasma |
| DEFFI | Desorption electro-flow focusing ionization | Extraction |
| DEMI | Desorption electrospray/metastable-induced ionization | Multimode |
| DESI | Desorption electrospray ionization | Extraction |
| DeSSI | Desorption sonic spray ionization | Extraction |
| DICE | Desorption ionization by charge exchange | Extraction |
| DIP-APCI | Direct inlet probe–atmospheric-pressure chemical ionization | Two-step |
| DPESI | Direct probe electrospray ionization | |
| EADESI | Electrode-assisted desorption electrospray ionization | Extraction |
| EASI | Easy ambient sonic-spray ionization | Extraction |
| EESI | Extractive electrospray ionization | Two step |
| ELDI | Electrospray laser desorption ionization | Laser |
| ESA-Py | Electrospray-assisted pyrolysis ionization | Spray |
| ESTASI | Electrostatic spray ionization | Extraction |
| FAPA | Flowing atmospheric pressure afterglow | Plasma |
| FIDI | Field-induced droplet ionization | |
| HALDI | High-voltage-assisted laser desorption ionization | Laser |
| HAPGDI | Helium atmospheric pressure glow discharge ionization | Plasma |
| IR-LAMICI | Infrared laser ablation metastable-induced chemical ionization | Laser |
| JeDI | Jet desorption electrospray ionization | Extraction |
| LADESI | Laser assisted desorption electrospray ionization | Laser |
| LAESI | Laser ablation electrospray ionization | Laser |
| LA-FAPA | Laser ablation flowing atmospheric pressure afterglow | Laser |
| LA-ICP | Laser ablation inductively coupled plasma | Laser |
| LD-APCI | Laser desorption atmospheric pressure chemical ionization | Laser |
| LDTD | Laser diode thermal desorption | Laser |
| LDESI | Laser desorption electrospray ionization | Laser |
| LDSPI | Laser desorption spray post-ionization | Laser |
| LEMS | Laser electrospray mass spectrometry | Laser |
| LESA | Liquid extraction surface analysis | Extraction |
| LIAD-ESI | Laser-induced acoustic desorption-electrospray ionization | Acoustic |
| LMJ-SSP | Liquid microjunction-surface sampling probe | Extraction |
| LPTD | Leidenfrost phenomenon-assisted thermal desorption | Two-step |
| LS-APGD | Liquid sampling-atmospheric pressure glow discharge | Plasma |
| LSI | Laser spray ionization | Other |
| LTP | Low temperature plasma | Plasma |
| MAII | Matrix-assisted inlet ionization | Other |
| MALDESI | Matrix-assisted laser desorption electrospray ionization | Laser |
| MFGDP | Microfabricated glow discharge plasma | Plasma |
| MIPDI | microwave induced plasma desorption ionization | Plasma |
| nano-DESI | Nanospray desorption electrospray ionization | Extraction |
| ND-EESI | Neutral desorption extractive electrospray ionization | Two step |
| PADI | Plasma-assisted desorption ionization | Plasma |
| Paint Spray* | Paint spray | Extraction |
| PALDI | Plasma-assisted laser desorption ionization | Laser |
| PAMLDI | Plasma-assisted multiwavelength laser desorption ionization | Laser |
| PASIT | Plasma-based ambient sampling/ionization/transmission | Extraction |
| PAUSI | Paper assisted ultrasonic spray ionization | |
| PESI | Probe electrospray ionization | Two step |
| PS | Paper spray | |
| PTC-ESI | Pipette tip column electrospray ionization | Extraction |
| RADIO | Radiofrequency acoustic desorption and ionization | Acoustic |
| RASTIR | Remote analyte sampling transport and ionization relay | |
| REIMS | Rapid evaporative ionization mass spectrometry | Other |
| RoPPI | Robotic plasma probe ionization | Two-step |
| SACI | Surface activated chemical ionization | |
| SAII | Solvent-assisted inlet ionization | Other |
| SAWN | Surface acoustic wave nebulization | Acoustic |
| SESI | Secondary electrospray ionization | Vapor-ion, charge transfer |
| SPA-nanoESI | Solid probe assisted nanoelectrospray ionization | Two-step |
| SPAMS | Single-particle aerosol mass spectrometry | Other |
| SSI | Sponge-Spray Ionization | |
| SSP | Surface sampling probe | Extraction |
| SwiFerr | Switched ferroelectric plasma ionizer | Other |
| TDAMS | Thermal desorption-based ambient mass spectrometry | Spray |
| TM-DESI | Transmission mode desorption electrospray ionization | Extraction |
| TS | Touch spray | Two-step |
| UASI | Ultrasonication-assisted spray ionization | Acoustic |
| V-EASI | Venturi easy ambient sonic-spray ionization | Extraction |
| BS | Brush-Spray Ionization | Two-step |
| FS | Fiber-Spray Ionization | Extraction |

(*) Not an acronym.

== Table of commercially available ambient ionization sources ==
| Technique | Commercial Brand | Company | Website |
|---|---|---|---|
| Ambient Pressure Photo Ionization (APPI) | MasCom GC-(APPI) | MasCom Technologies GmbH | https://www.mascom-bremen.de/ |
| Atmospheric pressure solids analysis probe (ASAP) | RADIAN | Waters, USA | https://www.waters.com/ |
| Desorption Electrospray Ionization (DESI) | DESI2D | Prosolia Inc, Indianapolis, IN | https://prosolia.com/ |
| Direct Analysis in Real Time (DART) | DART | IonSense Inc, Saugus, MA | https://www.ionsense.com/ |
| Liquid Extraction Surface Analysis (LESA) | TriVersaNanoMate | Advion, Ithaca, NY | https://advion.com/ |
| Probe Electrospray Ionization (PESI) | DPiMS-8060 | Shimadzu, Japan | https://www.shimadzu.com/ |
| Rapid evaporative Ionization Mass Spectrometry (REIMS) | REIMS | Waters, USA | https://www.waters.com/ |
| Secondary Electrospray Ionization (SESI) | SUPER SESI | Fossil Ion Technology, Spain | https://www.fossiliontech.com/ |
| Soft Ionization by Chemical Reaction In Transfer (SICRIT) | SICRIT | Plasmion GmbH, Germany | https://plasmion.com/ |
