= EESI =

EESI may refer to:

- Environmental and Energy Study Institute
- Extractive electrospray ionization
