= Sinués (disambiguation) =

Sinués is a locality located in the municipality of Aísa, in Huesca province, Aragon, Spain.

Sinues or Sinués may also refer to:

- Javier Ramírez Sinués (1898–1977), Spanish politician and official
- María del Pilar Sinués de Marco (1835-1893), 19th-century Spanish writer
- Pablo Sinues, associate professor, University of Basel
