= Vapur =

Vapur may refer to:

- A brand of BPA-free, collapsible, reusable water bottles, also known as Anti-Bottles
- A product of IonSense, a gas ion separator
- An electronic cigarette, using water vapor, aimed to help smokers quit
- A Turkish word for ferry or ship
