= Laser ablation electrospray ionization =

Ambient ionization method

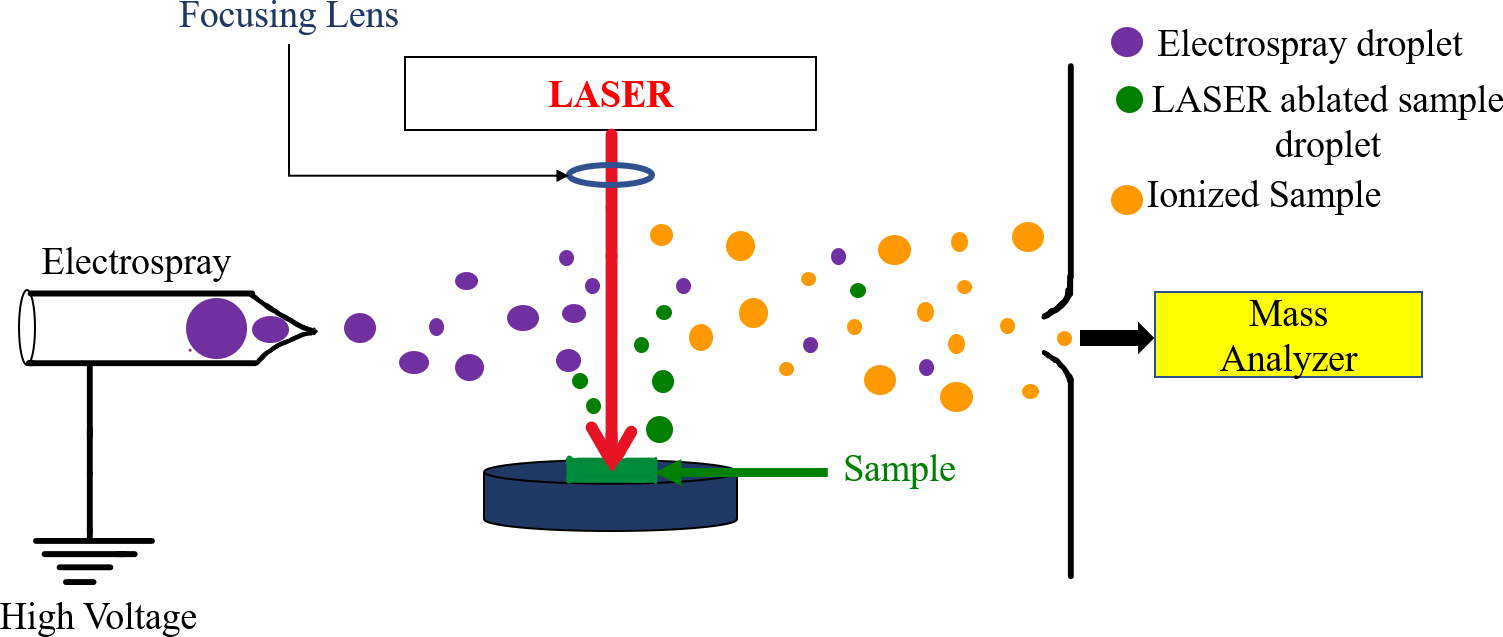
Schematic representation of laser ablation electrospray ionization (LAESI)

Laser ablation electrospray ionization (LAESI) is an ambient ionization method for mass spectrometry that combines laser ablation from a mid-infrared (mid-IR) laser with a secondary electrospray ionization (ESI) process. The mid-IR laser is used to generate gas phase particles which are then ionized through interactions with charged droplets from the ESI source. LAESI was developed in Professor Akos Vertes lab by Peter Nemes in 2007 and it was marketed commercially by Protea Biosciences, Inc until 2017. Fiber-LAESI for single-cell analysis approach was developed by Bindesh Shrestha in Professor Vertes lab in 2009. LAESI is a novel ionization source for mass spectrometry (MS) that has been used to perform MS imaging of plants, tissues, cell pellets, and even single cells. In addition, LAESI has been used to analyze historic documents and untreated biofluids such as urine and blood. The technique of LAESI is performed at atmospheric pressure and therefore overcomes many of the obstacles of traditional MS techniques, including extensive and invasive sample preparation steps and the use of high vacuum. Because molecules and aerosols are ionized by interacting with an electrospray plume, LAESI's ionization mechanism is similar to SESI and EESI techniques.

LAESI can be used to perform MS analysis of many different classes of compounds ranging from small molecules, such as pharmaceuticals, saccharides, lipids, and metabolites to larger biomolecules like peptides and proteins. LAESI has also been shown to have a quantitative dynamic range of 4 decades and a limit of detection (LOD) of 8 fmol with verapamil, a small pharmaceutical molecule. The technique has a lateral resolution of <200 μm for imaging applications and has been used for 3D imaging of plant tissues. Additionally, in cell-by-cell LAESI imaging experiments single cells can be used as the pixels of the molecular image. This LAESI application uses etched optical fibers to produce laser spot sizes of <50 μm to deliver the laser energy and has also been utilized in single cell analysis experiments.

== Principle of operation ==
LAESI produces ions for MS analysis under normal atmospheric conditions for samples containing water. The entire process can be divided into two steps.

=== Generation of analyte species ===
When a mid-IR laser beam is applied to a target which contains a hydroxide group, the target will absorb energy from this laser beam leading to evaporation of moisture from the targeted area. A small-scale explosion occurs in the target and a small portion of the sample is ablated into the gas phase by a short (5 ns), mid-IR (2,940 nm) laser pulse. The plume expands until it collapses into the sample due to the pressure exerted by the atmosphere. At this point a jet of material is ejected from the sample surface. As mid-IR has low energy most of the ejected particles from sample remain neutral.

=== Reacting analyte species with charged solvent species ===
An electrospray ionization (ESI) source is located above the sample for post-ablation ionization. The jet of ablated material is intersected and ionized by a spray plume from the ESI source located above the sample. The ionized molecules are then swept into the mass spectrometer for analysis. Because an ESI source is used for ionization, the LAESI mass spectra are similar to traditional ESI spectra, which can exhibit multiply charged analyte peaks, and extend the effective mass range of detection to biomolecules >100,000 Da in size.

== Applications ==
LAESI can be used to perform MS imaging experiments of diverse tissue samples, not only in three dimensions but also with respect to time. Similarly, LAESI can also be used for process monitoring applications because each individual analysis requires less than 2 seconds to perform. Because of the speed of a LAESI analysis, the technique is amenable to rapid, sensitive, and direct analysis of aqueous samples in 96- and 384-well microplates. These analyses can also be performed on liquid samples, such as biofluids, containing peptides, proteins, metabolites, and other biomarkers for clinical, diagnostic, and discovery workflows. LAESI technology allows high throughput analysis of these sample types and the use of internal standards and calibration curves permit the absolute quantitation of targeted biomolecules.

== Advantages and limitations ==
=== Advantages ===
This technique needs very little or no sample preparation and it has high sensitivity. This ionization technique does not need any external matrix. Therefore, the spatial resolution is not compromised by the presence of matrix crystal resulting in high spatial resolution. This ionization technique can be carried out in natural and uneven biological surface. Finally, as laser ablation and electronspray ionization work independently, they can be independently manipulated to achieve greater resolution.

=== Limitations ===
LAESI is a relatively new technique for those samples which contain water and are relatively stable. However, it has limitations for those samples which have a lower water content. For example, this technique does not ionize dry skin, nails, tooth and bone well; this is due to low water content in these samples. Also, it needs a relatively large sampling area, compared to some other common ionization techniques.

== See also ==
- Electrospray ionization
- Extractive electrospray ionization
- Matrix-assisted laser desorption electrospray ionization (MALDESI)
- Secondary electrospray ionization
