= IonSense =

- Type: Private
- Industry: Analytical Instruments
- Founded: 2005
- Headquarters: Saugus, Massachusetts, United States
- Area served: Worldwide
- Products: DART Ion Sources and Accessories
- Website: https://web.archive.org/web/20200122051757/https://www.ionsense.com/

IonSense, Inc. is a Massachusetts-based company that is developing technology for the analysis of materials by direct analysis in real time or DART mass spectrometry. DART MS provides rapid qualitative and quantitative sample analysis of bioanalytical, medicinal, forensic, and chemical synthesis products by ambient mass spectrometry.

IonSense provides the DART Ion Sources which are interfaced to mass spectrometry systems manufactured by JEOL, Thermo Fisher Scientific, Bruker, Applied Biosystems, Agilent, and Waters.

IonSense was acquired by Bruker in April 2022.
