= Desorption electrospray ionization =

Ambient ionization technique

Desorption Electrospray Ionization (DESI)
- Acronym: DESI
- Classification: Mass spectrometry
- Analytes: Organic molecules Biomolecules

Other techniques
- Related: Electrospray ionization Atmospheric pressure chemical ionization

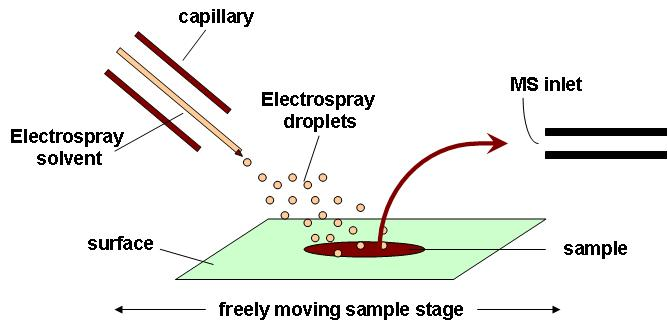
Schematic diagram of the DESI ion source

Desorption electrospray ionization (DESI) is an ambient ionization technique that can be coupled to mass spectrometry (MS) for chemical analysis of samples at atmospheric conditions. Coupled ionization sources-MS systems are popular in chemical analysis because the individual capabilities of various sources combined with different MS systems allow for chemical determinations of samples. DESI employs a fast-moving charged solvent stream, at an angle relative to the sample surface, to extract analytes from the surfaces and propel the secondary ions toward the mass analyzer. This tandem technique can be used to analyze forensics analyses, pharmaceuticals, plant tissues, fruits, intact biological tissues, enzyme-substrate complexes, metabolites and polymers. Therefore, DESI-MS may be applied in a wide variety of sectors including food and drug administration, pharmaceuticals, environmental monitoring, and biotechnology.

== History ==
DESI has been widely studied since its inception in 2004 by Zoltan Takáts, Justin Wiseman and Bogdan Gologan, in Graham Cooks' group from Purdue University with the goal of looking into methods that didn't require the sample to be inside of a vacuum. Both DESI and direct analysis in real time (DART) have been largely responsible for the rapid growth in ambient ionization techniques, with a proliferation of more than eighty new techniques being found today. These methods allow for complex systems to be analyzed without preparation and throughputs as high as 45 samples a minute. DESI is a combination of popular techniques, such as, electrospray ionization and surface desorption techniques. Electrospray ionization with mass spectrometry was reported by Malcolm Dole in 1968, but John Bennett Fenn was awarded a nobel prize in chemistry for the development of ESI-MS in the late 1980s. Then in 1999, desorption of open surface and free matrix experiments were reported in the literature utilizing an experiment that was called desorption/ionization on silicon. The combination of these two advancements led to the introduction of DESI and DART as the main ambient ionization techniques that would later become multiple different techniques. One in particular, due to increasing studies into optimization of DESI, is nanospray desorption electrospray ionization (nano-DESI). In this technique the analyte is desorbed into a liquid bridge formed between two capillaries and the analysis surface.

== Principle of operation ==
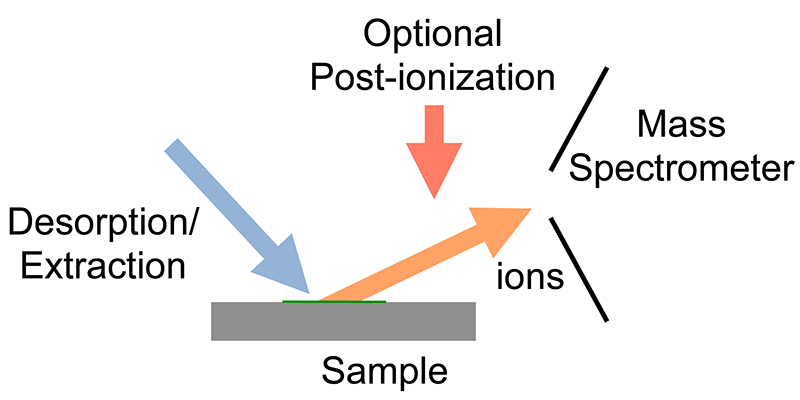

DESI is a combination of electrospray (ESI) and desorption (DI) ionization methods. Ionization takes place by directing an electrically charged mist to the sample surface that is a few millimeters away. The electrospray mist is pneumatically directed at the sample where subsequent splashed droplets carry desorbed, ionized analytes. After ionization, the ions travel through air into the atmospheric pressure interface which is connected to the mass spectrometer. DESI is a technique that allows for ambient ionization of a trace sample at atmospheric pressure, with little sample preparation. DESI can be used to investigate in situ, secondary metabolites specifically looking at both spatial and temporal distributions.

=== Ionization mechanism ===
In DESI there are two kinds of ionization mechanism, one that applies to low molecular weight molecules and another to high molecular weight molecules. High molecular weight molecules, such as proteins and peptides show electrospray like spectra where multiply charged ions are observed. This suggests desorption of the analyte, where multiple charges in the droplet can easily be transferred to the analyte. The charged droplet hits the sample, spreads over a diameter greater than its original diameter, dissolves the protein and rebounces. The droplets travel to the mass spectrometer inlet and are further desolvated. The solvent typically used for the electrospray is a combination of methanol and water.

For the low molecular weight molecules, ionization occurs by charge transfer: an electron or a proton. There are three possibilities for the charge transfer. First, charge transfer between a solvent ion and an analyte on the surface. Second, charge transfer between a gas phase ion and analyte on the surface; in this case the solvent ion is evaporated before reaching the sample surface. This is achieved when the spray to surface distance is large. Third, charge transfer between a gas phase ion and a gas phase analyte molecule. This occurs when a sample has a high vapour pressure.

$\ce{{A^-_{(aq)}} + S_{(s)} -> {A_{(aq)}} + S^-_{(s)}}$	1

$\ce{{A^-_{(g)}} + S_{(s)} -> {A_{(g)}} + S^-_{(s)}}$	2

$\ce{{A^-_{(g)}} + S_{(g)} -> {A_{(g)}} + S^-_{(g)}}$	3

The ionization mechanism of low molecular weight molecules in DESI is similar to DART's ionization mechanism, in that there is a charge transfer that occurs in the gas phase.

== Ionization efficiency ==
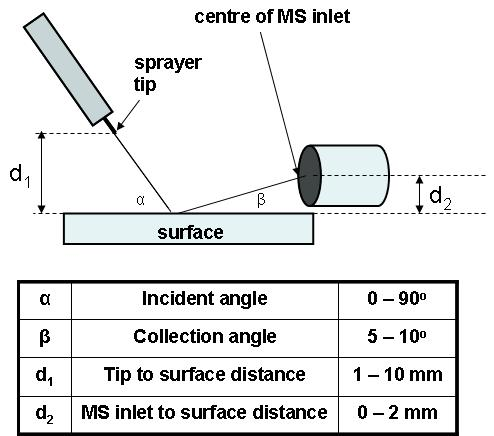
Side view of DESI ion source along with a table containing typical values for the geometric parameters

The ionization efficiency of DESI is complex and depends on several parameters such as, surface effects, electrospray parameters, chemical parameters and geometric parameters. Surface effects include chemical composition, temperature and electric potential applied. Electrospray parameters include electrospray voltage, gas and liquid flow rates. Chemical parameters refers to the sprayed solvent composition, e.g. addition of NaCl. Geometric parameters are α, β, d_{1} and d_{2} (see figure on the right).

Furthermore, α and d_{1} affect the ionization efficiency, while β and d_{2} affect the collection efficiency. Results of a test performed on a variety of molecules to determine optimal α and d1 values show that there are two sets of molecules: high molecular weight (proteins, peptides, oligosaccharide etc.) and low molecular weight (diazo dye, stereoids, caffeine, nitroaromatics etc.). The optimal conditions for the high molecular weight group are high incident angles (70–90°) and short d_{1} distances (1–3 mm). The optimal conditions for the low molecular weight group are the opposite, low incident angles (35–50°) and long d_{1} distances (7–10 mm). These test results indicate that each group of molecules has a different ionization mechanism; described in detail in the Principle of operation section.

The sprayer tip and the surface holder are both attached to a 3D moving stage which allow to select specific values for the four geometric parameters: α, β, d_{1} and d_{2}.

== Applications ==
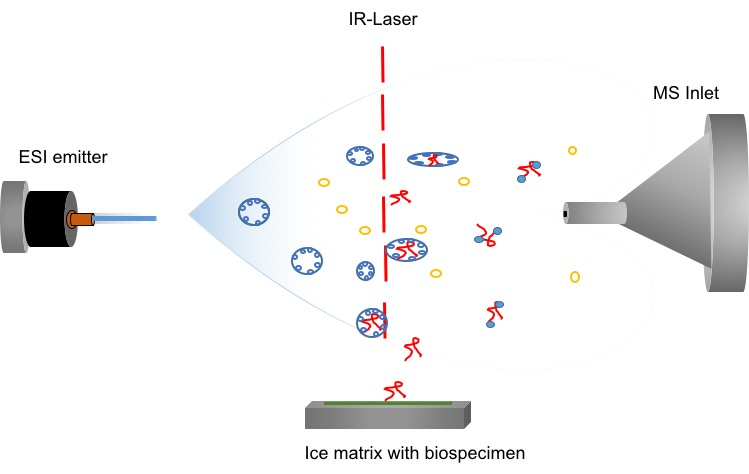
MALDESI of biomolecules on an ice matrix

=== Laser ablation electrospray ionization ===
Laser ablation electrospray ionization (LAESI) mass spectrometry is an ambient ionization technique applicable to plant and animal tissue imaging, live-cell imaging, and most recently to cell-by-cell imaging. This technique uses a mid-IR laser to ablate the sample which creates a cloud of neutral molecules. This cloud is then hit with the electrospray from above to cause ionization. The desorbed ions are then able to pass into the mass spectrometer for analysis. This method is also good for imaging in applications. The analyses can be desorbed through a pulsed laser irradiation without the need of a matrix. This method is best used with small organic molecules up to larger biomolecules as well.

==== Matrix assisted laser desorption electrospray ionization ====
Another method good for biomolecules is matrix assisted laser desorption electrospray ionization (MALDESI). In this technique, it utilizes Infrared laser ionization to excite the sample molecules to allow for the desorbed ions to be ready for MS analysis. The geometry of the source and the distance between the ESI and matrix will have and effect on the efficiency of the sample compound. This technique can also be used with aqueous samples as well. The water droplet can be placed at the focal point of the laser, or the droplet can be dried to form the solid. Planar samples do not need sample preparation to perform this experiment.

=== Ion mobility mass spectrometry ===
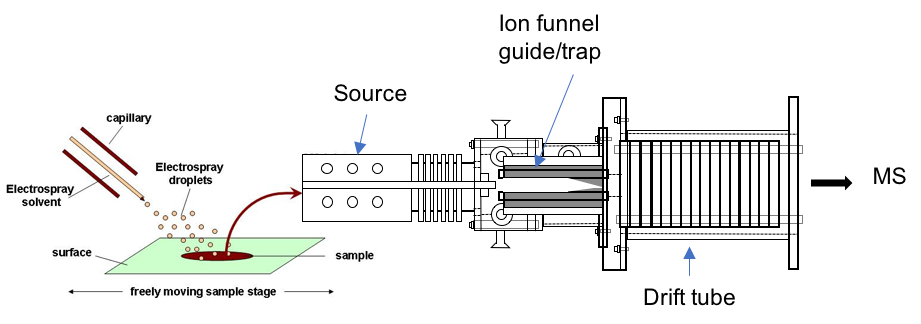
Schematic of DESI-IMS-TOF mass spectrometer

Ion mobility spectrometry (IMS) is a technique of ion separation in gaseous phases based on their differences in ion mobility when an electric field is applied providing spatial separation prior to MS analysis. With the introduction of DESI as an ion source for ion mobility mass spectrometry, applications for IMS have expanded from only vapor-phase samples with volatile analyses to also intact structures and aqueous samples. When coupled to a time-of-flight mass spectrometer, analysis of proteins is also possible. These techniques work in tandem to one another to investigate ion shapes and reactiveness after ionization. A key characteristic of this setup is its ability to separate the distribution of ions generated in DESI prior to mass spectrometry analysis.

=== Fourier transform ion cyclotron resonance ===
As stated before, DESI allows for a direct investigation of natural samples without needing any sample preparation or chromatographic separation. But, because of this unneeded sample prep the spectrum created maybe very complex. Therefore, you can couple a Fourier transform ion cyclotron resonance to DESI, allowing for a higher resolution. The DESI can be composed of six linear moving stages and one rotating stage. This can include a 3-D linear stage for samples and another with the rotating stage for the spray mount. Coupling of an FTICR to DESI can increase mass accuracy to below 3 parts per million. This can be done on both liquid and solid samples.

=== Liquid chromatography ===
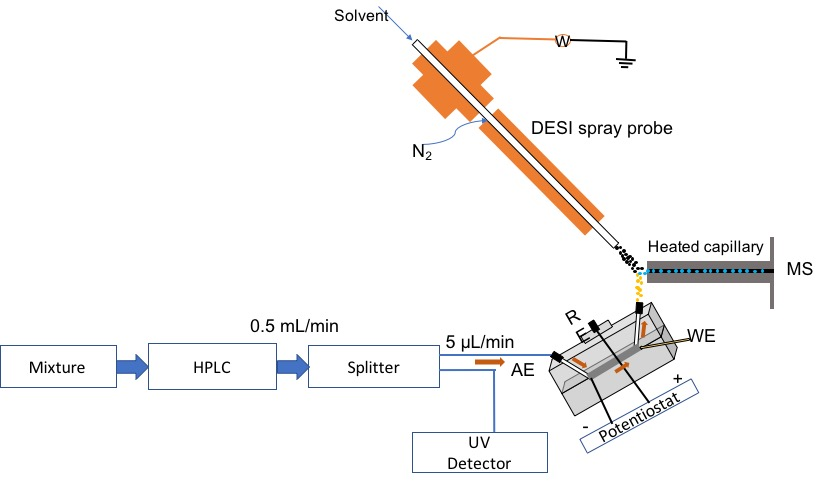
Liquid chromatography coupled to DESI-MS. AE is auxiliary electrode, RE: reference electrode, WE: working electrode.

DESI can be coupled to ultra-fast liquid chromatography using an LC eluent splitting strategy. It is a strategy through a tiny orifice on an LC capillary tube. There is negligible dead volume and back pressure that allows for almost real time mass spectrometry detection with a fast elution and purification. This coupling can be used to ionize a wide range of molecules, from small organics to high mass proteins. This is different from ESI (electrospray ionization) in that it can be used to directly analyze salt-containing sample solutions without requiring “make-up” solvents/ acids to be doped into the sample. This set up allows for a high flow rate without splitting. The high resolution that is accomplished by reverse-phase HPLC can be combined with this procedure to produce high throughput screening of natural products as well. The incorporation of the electrochemistry component helps with ionization efficiency via the electrochemical conversion. This method is proved better than ESI in the fact that you don't have to separate the small potential that is applied to the cell from the potential on the spray in DESI. DESI also shows a better tolerance to inorganic salt electrolytes and you can use traditional solvents used in electrolysis.

=== Direct analysis of biotransformations ===
An adaptation of DESI is used to analyze enzyme-triggered chemical reactions, known as biotransformations, in enzymes and their products. Coupled with high-resolution mass spectrometry, this procedure, known as DiBT-MS, can analyze a substrate 10-10,000 times quicker than LC-MS. DESI specifically can analyze the products in situ, removing the need for high solvent usage and creating these quicker analysis times.

== Instrumentation ==
In DESI, there is a high-velocity pneumatically assisted electrospray jet that is continually directed towards the probe surface. The jet forms a micrometer-size thin solvent film on the sample where it can be desorbed. The sample can be dislodged by the incoming spray jet allowing for particles to come off in an ejection cone of analyte containing secondary ion droplets. A lot of study is still going into looking at the working principals of DESI but there are still some things known. The erosion diameter of the spray spot formed by DESI is known to be directly tied to the spatial resolution. Both the chemical composition and the texture of the surface will also affect the ionization process. The nebulizing gas used most commonly is N_{2} set at a typical pressure of 160 psi. The solvent is a combination of methanol and water, sometimes paired with 0.5% acetic acid and at a flow rate of 10 μL/min. The surface can be mounted it two different ways, one way consists of a surface holder that can carry 1 x 5 cm large disposable surface slides that lie on a stainless steel surface. The steel surface has a voltage applied to provide an appropriate surface potential. The surface potential that can be applied is the same at which the sprayer can be set at. The second surface is made with an aluminum block that has a built in heater, this allows for temperature control with temperatures up to 300 °C with newer stages having built in CCD's and light sources. Their spectra are that similar to ESI. They feature multiply charged ions alkali metal adducts and non covalent complexes that originate from the condensed phase of the sample/solvent interaction. DESI is revealed to have a more gentle ionization condition that leads to a more pronounced tendency for metal adduct formation and a lower specific charging of secondary droplets.

== See also ==
- Secondary ion mass spectrometry
- Matrix-assisted laser desorption ionization
- Mass spectrometry imaging
- Electrospray ionization
- Secondary electrospray ionization
