= Desorption atmospheric pressure photoionization =

Ambient ionization technique

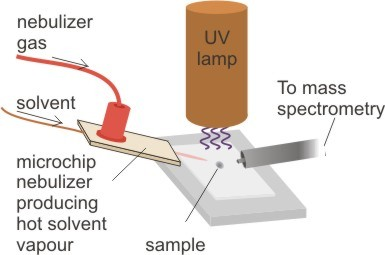
Desorption atmospheric pressure photoionization schematic

Desorption atmospheric pressure photoionization (DAPPI) is an ambient ionization technique for mass spectrometry that uses hot solvent vapor for desorption in conjunction with photoionization. Ambient Ionization techniques allow for direct analysis of samples without pretreatment. The direct analysis technique, such as DAPPI, eliminates the extraction steps seen in most nontraditional samples. DAPPI can be used to analyze bulkier samples, such as, tablets, powders, resins, plants, and tissues. The first step of this technique utilizes a jet of hot solvent vapor. The hot jet thermally desorbs the sample from a surface. The vaporized sample is then ionized by the vacuum ultraviolet light and consequently sampled into a mass spectrometer. DAPPI can detect a range of both polar and non-polar compounds, but is most sensitive when analyzing neutral or non-polar compounds. This technique also offers a selective and soft ionization for highly conjugated compounds.

== History ==
The history of desorption atmospheric pressure photoionization is relatively new, but can be traced back through developments of ambient ionization techniques dating back to the 1970s. DAPPI is a combination of popular techniques, such as, atmospheric pressure photoionziation (APPI) and surface desorption techniques. The photoionization techniques were first developed in the late 1970s and began being used in atmospheric pressure experiments in the mid 1980s. Early developments in the desorption of open surface and free matrix experiments were first reported in literature in 1999 in an experiment using desorption/ionization on silicon (DIOS). DAPPI replaced techniques such as desorption electrospray ionization (DESI) and direct analysis in real time (DART). This generation of techniques are all recent developments seen in the 21st century. DESI was discovered in 2004 at Purdue University, while DART was discovered in 2005 by Laramee and Cody. DAPPI was developed soon after in 2007 at the University of Helsinki, Finland. The development of DAPPI widened the range of detection for nonpolar compounds and added a new dimension of thermal desorption of direct analysis samples.

== Principle of operation ==
The first operation to occur during desorption atmospheric pressure photoionization is desorption. Desorption of the sample is initiated by a hot jet of solvent vapor that is targeted onto the sample by a nebulizer microchip. The nebulizer microchip is a glass device bonded together by pyrex wafers with flow channels embedded from a nozzle at the edge of the chip. The microchip is heated to 250-350$^\circ$C in order to vaporize the entering solvent and create dopant molecules. Dopant molecules are added to help facilitate the ionization of the sample. Some of the common solvents include: nitrogen, toluene, acetone, and anisole. The desorption process can occur by two mechanisms: thermal desorption or momentum transfer/liquid spray. Thermal desorption uses heat to volatilize the sample and increase the surface temperature of the substrate. As the substrate's surface temperature is increased, the higher the sensitivity of the instrument. While studying the substrate temperature, it was seen that the solvent did not have a noticeable effect on the final temperature or heat rate of the substrate. Momentum transfer or liquid spray desorption is based on the solvent interaction with the sample, causing the release of specific ions. The momentum transfer is propagated by the collision of the solvent with the sample along with the transfer of ions with the sample. The transfer of positive ions, such as protons and charge transfers, are seen with the solvents: toluene and anisole. Toluene goes through a charge exchange mechanism with the sample, while acetone promotes a proton transfer mechanism with the sample. A beam of 10 eV photons that are given off by a UV lamp is directed at the newly desorbed molecules, as well as the dopant molecules. Photoionization then occurs, which knocks out the molecule's electron and produces an ion. This technique alone is not highly efficient for different varieties of molecules, particularly those that are not easily protonated or deprotonated. In order to completely ionize samples, dopant molecules must help. The gaseous solvent can also undergo photoionization and act as an intermediate for ionization of the sample molecules. Once dopant ions are formed, proton transfer can occur with the sample, creating more sample ions. The ions are then sent to the mass analyzer for analysis.

== Ionization mechanisms ==
The main desorption mechanism in DAPPI is thermal desorption due to rapid heating of the surface. Therefore, DAPPI only works well for surfaces of low thermal conductivity. The ionization mechanism depends on the analyte and solvent used. For example, the following analyte (M) ions may be formed: [M + H]^{+}, [M - H]^{−}, M^{+•}, M^{−•}.

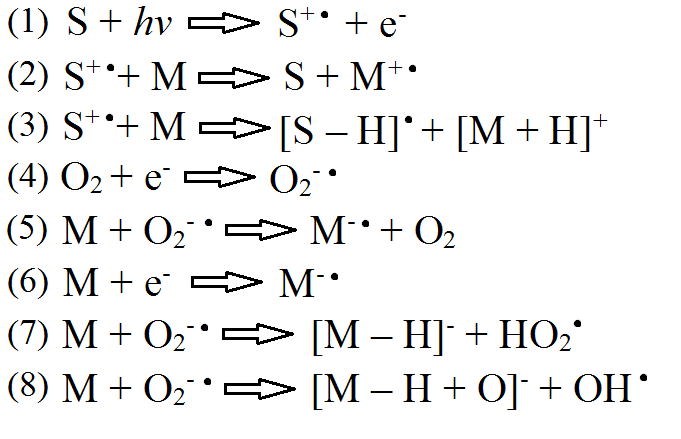
This mechanism shows the solvent (S) and the analyte (M) in desorption atmospheric pressure photoionization going through both positive ion and negative ion reaction.

== Types of component geometries ==
=== Reflection geometry ===
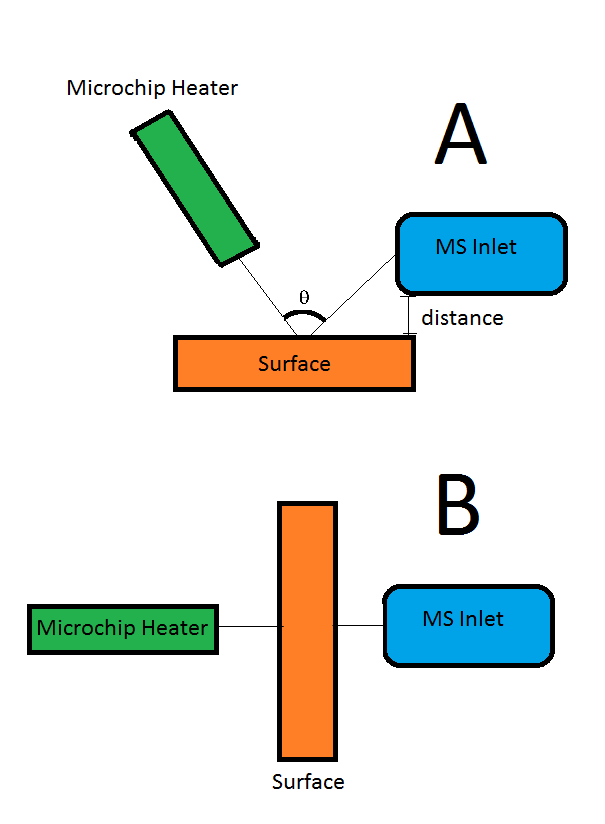
Figure A is a conventional DAPPI setup with a reflection geometry. Figure B is a transmission DAPPI technique. The UV Lamp (not seen in figure) is in the same place in both techniques. The UV Lamp is located above the surface space.

Considered the normal or conventional geometry of DAPPI, this mode is ideal for solid samples that do not need any former preparation. The microchip is parallel to the MS inlet. The microchip heater is aimed to hit the samples at $45^\circ$. The UV lamp is directly above the sample and it releases photons to interact with the desorbed molecules that are formed. The conventional method generally uses a higher heating power and gas flow rate for the nebulizer gas, while also increasing the amount of dopant used during the technique. These increases can cause higher background noise, analyte interference, substrate impurities, and more ion reactions from excess dopant ions.

=== Transmission geometry ===
This mode is specialized for analyzing liquid samples, with a metal or polymer mesh replacing the sample plate in reflection geometry. The mesh is oriented $180^\circ$ from the nebulizer microchip and the mass spec inlet, with the lamp directing photons to the area where the mesh releases newly desorbed molecules. The analyte is thermally desorbed as both the dopant vapor and nebulizer gas are directed through the mesh. It has been seen that steel mesh with low density and narrow strands produces better signal intensities. This type of mesh allows for larger openings in the surface and quicker heating of strands. Transmission mode uses a lower microchip heating power which eliminates some of the issues seen with the reflection geometry above, including low signal noise. This method can also improve the S/N ratio of smaller non-polar compounds.

== Instrument coupling ==
=== Separation techniques ===
Thin layer chromatography (TLC) is a simple separation technique that can be coupled with DAPPI-MS to identify lipids. Some of the lipids that were seen to be separated and ionized include: cholesterol, triacylglycerols, 1,2-diol diesters, wax esters, hydrocarbons, and cholesterol esters. TLC is normally coupled with instruments in vacuum or atmospheric pressure, but vacuum pressure gives poor sensitivity for more volatile compounds and has minimal area in the vacuum chambers. DAPPI was used for its ability to ionize neutral and non-polar compounds, and was seen to be a fast and efficient method for lipid detection as it was coupled with both NP-TLC and HPTLC plates.

Laser desorption is normally used in the presence of a matrix, such as matrix-assisted laser desorption/ionization (MALDI), but research has combined techniques of laser desorption in atmospheric pressure conditions to produce a method that does not use a matrix or discharge. This method is able to help with smaller compounds, and generates both positive and negative ions for detection. A transmission geometry is taken as the beam and spray are guided at a $180^\circ$angle into the coupled MS. Studies have shown the detection of organic compounds such as: farnesene, squalene, tetradecahydroanthracene, 5-alpha cholestane, perylene, benzoperylene, coronene, tetradecylprene, dodecyl sulfide, benzodiphenylene sulfide, dibenzosuberone, carbazole, and elipticine. This method was also seen to be coupled with the mass spectroscopy technique, FTICR, to detect shale oils and some smaller nitrogen containing aromatics.

=== Mass spectrometry ===
Fourier transform ion cyclotron resonance (FTICR) is a technique that is normally coupled with electrospray ionization (ESI), DESI, or DART, which allows for the detection of polar compounds. DAPPI allows for a broader range of polarities to be detected, and a range of molecular weights. Without separation or sample preparation, DAPPI is able to thermally desorb compounds such as oak biochars. The study did cite an issue with DAPPI. If the sample is not homogeneous, then the neutral ions will ionize only the surface, which does not provide an accurate detection for the substance. The scanning of the FTICR allows for the detection of complex compounds with high resolution, which leads to the ability to analyze elemental composition.

== Applications ==
DAPPI can analyze both polar (e.g. verapamil) and nonpolar (e.g. anthracene) compounds. This technique has an upper detection limit of 600 Da. Compared to desorption electrostray ionization (DESI), DAPPI is less likely to be contaminated by biological matrices. DAPPI was also seen to be more sensitive and contain less background noise than popular techniques such as direct analysis in real time (DART). Performance of DAPPI has also been demonstrated on direct analysis of illicit drugs. Other applications include lipid detection and drug analysis sampling. Lipids can be detected through a coupling procedure with orbitrap mass spectroscopy. DAPPI has also been known to couple with liquid chromotography and gas chromotography mass spectroscopy for the analysis of drugs and aerosol compounds. Studies have also shown where DAPPI has been used to find harmful organic compounds in the environment and in food, such as polycyclic aromatic hydrocarbons (PAH) and pesticides.

== See also ==
- Orbitrap
- Atmospheric pressure chemical ionization
