= Direct analysis in real time =

In mass spectrometry, direct analysis in real time (DART) is an ion source that produces electronically or vibronically excited-state species from gases such as helium, argon, or nitrogen that ionize atmospheric molecules or dopant molecules. The ions generated from atmospheric or dopant molecules undergo ion-molecule reactions with the sample molecules to produce analyte ions. Analytes with low ionization energy may be ionized directly. The DART ionization process can produce positive or negative ions depending on the potential applied to the exit electrode.

This ionization can occur for species desorbed directly from surfaces such as bank notes, tablets, bodily fluids (blood, saliva and urine), polymers, glass, plant leaves, fruits & vegetables, clothing, and living organisms. DART is applied for rapid analysis of a wide variety of samples at atmospheric pressure and in the open laboratory environment. It does not need a specific sample preparation, so it can be used for the analysis of solid, liquid and gaseous samples in their native state.

With the aid of DART, exact mass measurements can be done rapidly with high-resolution mass spectrometers. DART mass spectrometry has been used in pharmaceutical applications, forensic studies, quality control, and environmental studies.

== History ==
DART resulted from conversations between Laramee and Cody about the development of an atmospheric pressure ion source to replace the radioactive sources in handheld chemical weapons detectors. DART was developed in late 2002 to early 2003 by Cody and Laramee as a new atmospheric pressure ionization process, and a US patent application was filed in April 2003. Although the development of DART actually predated the desorption electrospray ionization (DESI) ion source, the initial DART publication did not appear until shortly after the DESI publication, and both ion sources were publicly introduced in back-to-back presentations by R. G. Cooks and R. B. Cody at the January 2005 ASMS Sanibel Conference. DESI and DART are considered as pioneer techniques in the field of ambient ionization, since they operate in the open laboratory environment and do not require sample pretreatment. In contrast to the liquid spray used by DESI, the ionizing gas from the DART ion source contains a dry stream containing excited state species.

== Principle of operation ==
=== Ionization process ===
==== Formation of metastable species ====
As the gas (M) enters the ion source, an electric potential in the range of +1 to +5 kV is applied to generate a glow discharge. The glow discharge plasma contains short-lived energetic species including electrons, ions, and excimers. Ion/electron recombination leads to the formation of long-lived excited-state neutral atoms or molecules (metastable species, M*) in the flowing afterglow region. The DART gas can be heated from room temperature (RT) to 550 °C to facilitate desorption of analyte molecules. Heating is optional but may be necessary depending on the surface or chemical being analyzed. The heated stream of gaseous metastable species passes through a porous exit electrode that is biased to a positive or negative potential in the range 0 to 530V. When biased to a positive potential, the exit electrode acts to remove electrons and negative ions formed by Penning ionization from the gas stream to prevent ion/electron recombination and ion loss. If the exit electrode is biased to a negative potential, electrons can be generated directly from the electrode material by surface Penning ionization. An insulator cap at the terminal end of the ion source protects the operator from harm.

$$\ce{{M} + energy -> {M^{\ast}}}$$

DART can be used for the analysis of solid, liquid or gaseous samples. Liquids are typically analyzed by dipping an object (such as a glass rod) into the liquid sample and then presenting it to the DART ion source. Vapors are introduced directly into the DART gas stream.

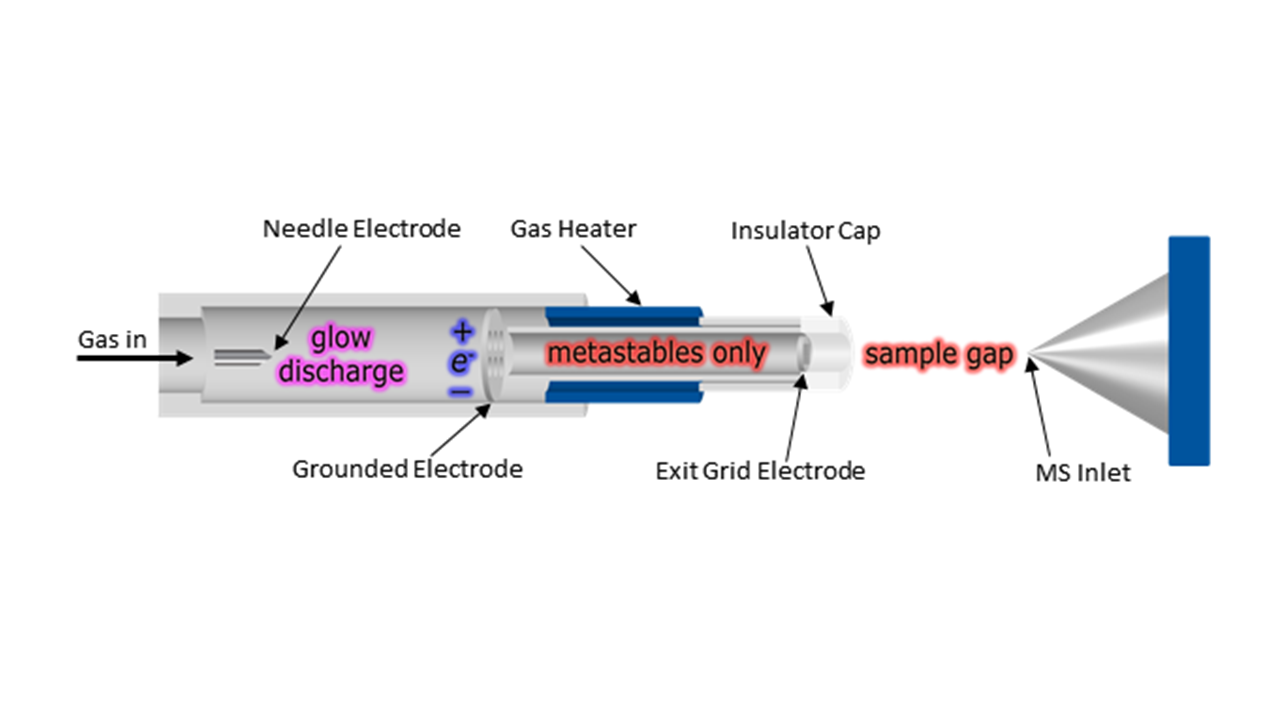
Schematic diagram of a DART ion source

==== Positive ion formation ====
Once the metastable carrier gas atoms (M*) released from the source, they initiate Penning ionization of nitrogen, atmospheric water and other gaseous species. Although some compounds can be ionized directly by Penning ionization, the most common positive-ion formation mechanism for DART involves ionization of atmospheric water.

$$\ce{{M^{\ast}} + {N2} -> {M} + {N2}^{+\bullet} + e^-}$$
$$\ce{{M^{\ast}} + {H2O} -> {M} + {H2O}^{+\bullet} + e^-}$$

Although the exact ion formation mechanism is not clear, water can be ionized directly by Penning ionization. Another proposal is that water is ionized by the same mechanism that has been proposed for atmospheric pressure chemical ionization

$$\ce{{N2^{+\bullet}} + {2N2} -> {N4^{+\bullet}} + {N2}}$$

$$\ce{{N4^{+\bullet}} + {H2O} -> {2N2} + {H2O}^{+\bullet}}$$

Ionized water can undergo further ion-molecule reactions to form protonated water clusters ([(H_{2}O)_{n}H]^{+}).

$$\ce{{H2O^{+\bullet}} + {H2O} -> {H3O+} + {OH^{\bullet}}}$$

$$\ce{{H3O^{+}} + {\mathit{n}}H2O -> { [ {\mathit{n}} H2O + H]^{+} }}$$

The stream of protonated water clusters acts as a secondary ionizing species and generates analytes ions by chemical ionization mechanisms at atmospheric pressure. Here protonation, deprotonation, direct charge transfer and adduct ion formation may occur.

$$\ce{S + [ {\mathit{n}}H2O  + H]^{+} -> {[{S} + H]^{+}} + {\mathit{n}}H2O}$$

$$\ce{{N4}^{+\bullet} + S -> {2N2} + S^{+\bullet}}$$

$$\ce{{O2}^{+\bullet} + S -> {O2} + S^{+\bullet}}$$

$$\ce{{NO^+} + S -> {NO} + S^{+\bullet}}$$

$$\ce{{[NH4]^{+}} + S -> { [{S} + NH4]^+ }}$$
Metastable argon atoms do not have enough internal energy to ionize water, so DART ionization with argon gas requires the use of a dopant.

==== Negative ion formation ====
In negative-ion mode, the potential of the exit grid electrode can be set to negative potentials. Penning electrons undergo electron capture with atmospheric oxygen to produce O_{2}^{−}. The O_{2}^{−} will produce radical anions. Several reactions are possible, depending on the analyte.

$$\ce{{O2} + {e}^{-} -> {O2} ^{-\bullet}}$$

$$\ce{{O2} ^{-\bullet} + {S} -> {S}^{-\bullet} + O2}$$

$$\ce{{S} + {e}^{-} ->  {S}^{-\bullet}}$$

$$\ce{{SX} + {e}^{-} ->  {S}^{-} + {X}^{\bullet}}$$

$$\ce{{SH}  ->  {[S-H]}^{-} + {H}^{+}}$$

The negative ion sensitivity of DART gases varies with the efficiency in forming electrons by Penning ionization, which means that the negative ion sensitivity increases with the internal energy of the metastable species, for example nitrogenᐸneonᐸhelium.

=== Instrumentation ===
==== Source to analyzer interface ====
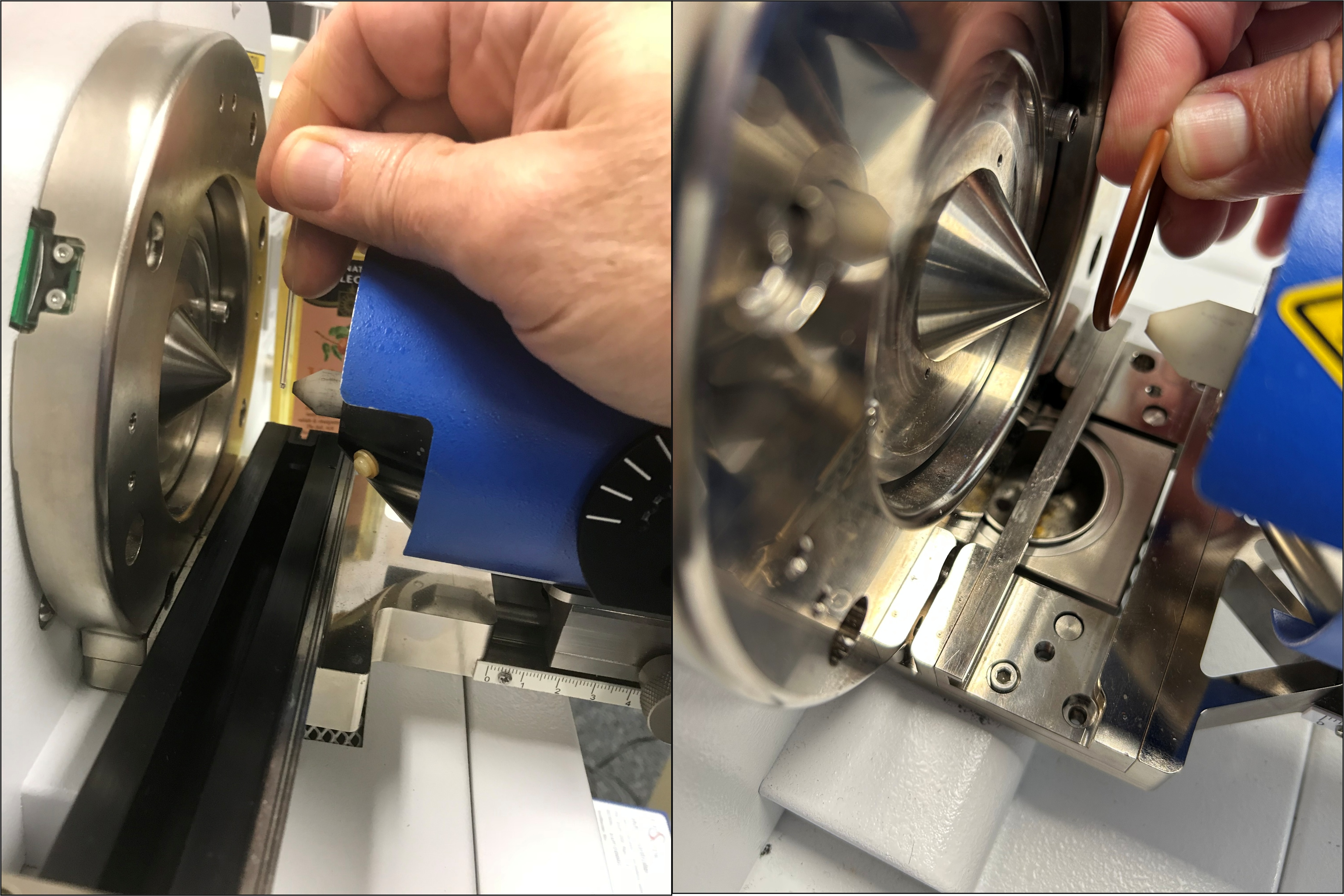
Left: a disposable glass capillary dipped in olive oil is held in the sample chamber between the DART ion source (right) and the spectrometer inlet (cone on left). Right: an elastic o-ring is suspended in the DART gas stream to identify additives and contaminants.

Analyte ions are formed at ambient pressure during Penning and chemical ionization. The mass spectrometry analysis, however, takes place at high vacuum condition. Therefore, ions entering the mass spectrometer, first go through a source - to - analyzer interface (vacuum interface), which was designed in order to bridge the atmospheric pressure region to the mass spectrometer vacuum. It also minimizes spectrometer contamination.

In the original JEOL atmospheric pressure interface used for DART, ions are directed to the ion guide through (outer) і and (inner) іі skimmer orifices by applying a slight potential difference between them: orifice і : 20 V and orifice іі : 5 V. The alignment of the two orifices is staggered to trap neutral contamination and protect the high-vacuum region. Charged species (ions) are guided to the second orifice through an intermediate cylindrical electrode ("ring lens"), but neutral molecules travel in a straight pathway and are thus blocked from entering the ion guide. The neutral contamination is then removed by the pump.

The DART source can be operated in surface desorption mode or transmission mode. In the ordinary surface desorption mode, the sample is positioned in a way, which enables the reactive DART reagent ion stream to flow on to the surface while allowing the flow of desorbed analyte ions into interface. Therefore, this mode requires that the gas stream grazes the sample surface and does not block gas flow to the mass spectrometer sampling orifice. In contrast, transmission mode DART (tm-DART) uses a custom-made sample holder and introduces the sample at a fixed geometry.

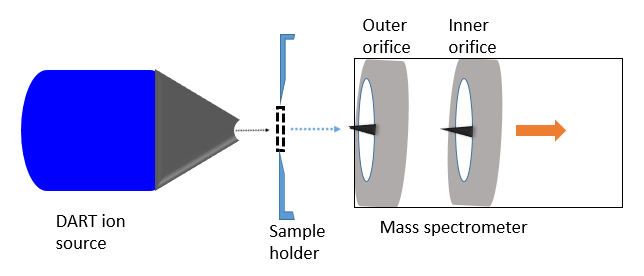
Schematic diagram of DART-transmission mode

==== Coupling with separation techniques ====
DART can be combined with many separation techniques. Thin-layer chromatography (TLC) plates have been analyzed by positioning them directly in the DART gas stream. Gas chromatography has been carried out by coupling gas chromatography columns directly into the DART gas stream through a heated interface. Eluate from a high-pressure liquid chromatograph (HPLC) can be also introduced to the reaction zone of the DART source and analyze. DART can be coupled with capillary electrophoresis (CE) and the eluate of CE is guided to the mass spectrometer through the DART ion source.

== Mass spectra ==
In positive ion mode, DART produces predominantly protonated molecules [M+H]^{+} and in negative-ion mode deprotonated molecules [M-H]^{−}. Both negative and positive modes of DART provides relatively simple mass spectra. Depending on the type of analyte, other species may be formed, such as multiple charged adducts. DART is categorized as a soft ionization technique. Fragmentation can be rarely observed for some molecules.

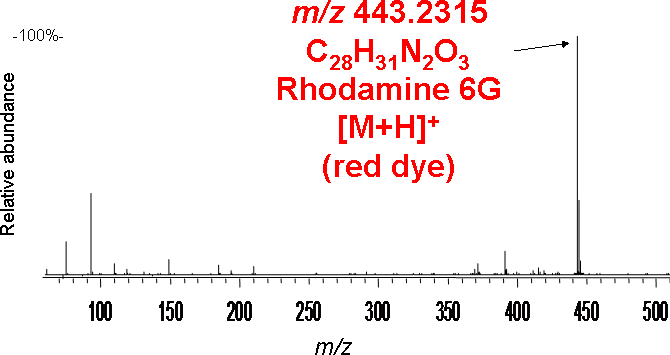
DART source red ink spectrum

Use of DART compared to traditional methods minimizes sample amount, sample preparation, eliminates extraction steps, decreases limit of detection and analysis time. Also it provides a broad range sensitivity, simultaneous determination of multi-drug analytes and sufficient mass accuracy for formulation determination.

The DART ion source is a kind of gas-phase ionization, and it requires some sort of volatility of the analyte to support thermally assisted desorption of analyte ions. This limits the size range of the molecules that can be analyzed by DART i.e. m/z 50 to 1200. DART-MS is capable of semi-quantitative and quantitative analysis. To accelerate sample release from the surface, the DART gas stream is usually heated to temperature in the range 100-500 °C and this operation can be employed for temperature-dependent analysis.

== Applications ==
DART is being applied in many fields, including the fragrance industry, pharmaceutical industry, foods and spices, forensic science and health, materials analysis, etc.

In forensic science, DART is used for analysis of explosives, warfare agents, drugs, inks and sexual assault evidence. In clinical and pharmaceutical sector, DART is utilized for body fluid analysis such as blood, plasma, urine etc. and study traditional medicines. Also DART can detect composition in medicine in a tablet form as per there is no need for sample preparation such as crushing or extracting.

In food industry, DART assures the quality and authenticity assessment of food. It is also used in the analysis of mycotoxins in beverages, semi-quantitative analysis of caffeine, monitoring heat accelerated decomposition of vegetable oils and many other food safety analysis. In the manufacturing industry, to determine the deposition and release of a fragrance on surfaces such as fabric and hair and dyes in textiles, DART is often utilized.

DART is used in environmental analysis. For example, analysis of organic UV filters in water, contaminants in soil, petroleum products and aerosols etc. DART also plays an important role in biological studies. It enables studying chemical profiles of plants and organisms.

== See also ==
- Ambient ionization
- Atmospheric pressure chemical ionization
- Atmospheric pressure photoionization
- Desorption atmospheric pressure photoionization
- Desorption electrospray ionization
- Electric glow discharge

== Patents ==
- Robert B. Cody and James A. Laramee, “Method for atmospheric pressure ionization” U.S. patent 6,949,741 issued September 27, 2005. (Priority date: April 2003).
- James A. Laramee and Robert B. Cody “Method for Atmospheric Pressure Analyte Ionization” U.S. patent 7,112,785 issued September 26, 2006.
