= Pablo Sinues =

Spanish chemist and mechanical engineer

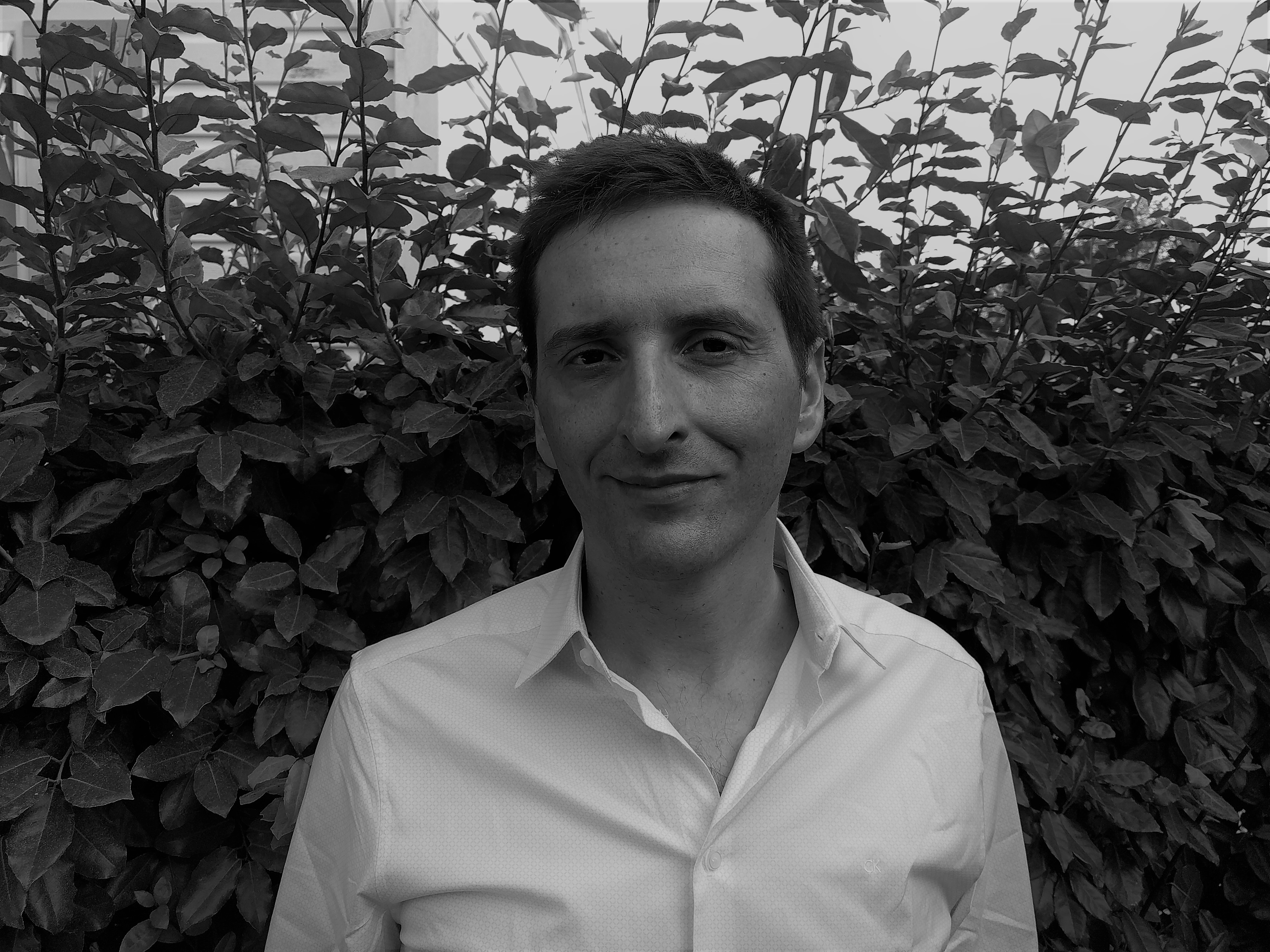
- Education: University of Murcia; Charles III University of Madrid
- Known for: Breath gas analysis; Analytical chemistry; Mass spectrometry
- Scientific career
- Fields: Chemistry; Mechanical Engineering
- Workplaces: University of Basel, Departement of Biomedical Engineering; University Children’s Hospital Basel(UKBB); ETH Zurich
- Doctoral advisor: Juan Fernandez de la Mora ( Yale University)

Pablo Sinues (also published as Pablo Martinez-Lozano Sinues) is an associate professor at the Department of Biomedical Engineering at the University of Basel (Basel, Switzerland) and lecturer at the Department of Chemistry and Applied Biosciences at ETH Zürich. He received his Ph.D. in Mechanical Engineering from the Charles III University of Madrid (Spain) and habilitation in Analytical Chemistry at ETH Zürich. Sinues heads the Translational Medicine Breath Research group located at the University Children’s Hospital Basel.

== Academic activity ==
Sinues has pioneered secondary electrospray ionization with a focus on breath gas analysis applications. He has authored and co-authored over 90 peer-reviewed articles covering fields ranging from engineering to medicine. He was president of the Society of Spanish Researchers in Switzerland (ACECH) from 2018 to 2021 and currently serves as the vice-president of the Swiss Metabolomics Society (SMS). He also assists as an expert for InnoSuisse, the Swiss Innovation Agency. Sinues is the principal investigator of the Research Network Zurich Exhalomics, which is an initiative by scientists from the Zurich area with the goal to provide technical solutions for the rapid and sensitive on-line analysis of breath. He is the co-inventor of eight patents and winner of the 2020 Swiss Group for Mass Spectrometry (SGMS) award. He co-founded the start-up company 'Deep Breath Intelligence (DBI)' to uncover the full potential of molecular breath analysis to advance precision medicine and make it available for general health care.

== Outreach Activities ==
- Martínez-Lozano et al., J Am Soc Mass Spectrom 2009, 20, 1060-63
- Martinez-Lozano Sinues et al., PLoS ONE 2013, 8
- BBC News
- ETH news (30/1/2016)
- Swiss national television (2/2/2016; in Italian)
