= Secondary electrospray ionization =

Ambient ionization technique

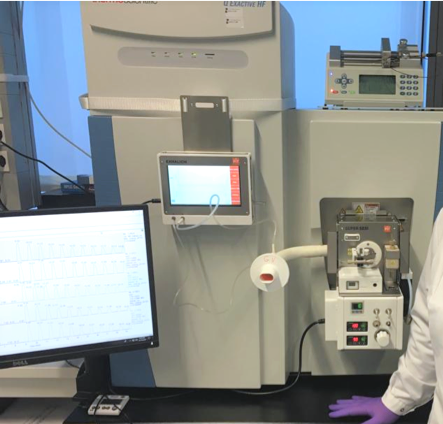
SESI-MS SUPER SESI coupled with Thermo Fisher Scientific-Orbitrap

Secondary electro-spray ionization (SESI) is an ambient ionization technique for the analysis of trace concentrations of vapors, where a nano-electrospray produces charging agents that collide with the analyte molecules directly in gas-phase. In the subsequent reaction, the charge is transferred and vapors get ionized, most molecules get protonated (in positive mode) and deprotonated (in negative mode). SESI works in combination with mass spectrometry or ion-mobility spectrometry.

== History ==
The fact that trace concentrations of gases in contact with an electrospray plume were efficiently ionized was first observed by Fenn and colleagues when they noted that tiny concentrations of plasticizers produced intense peaks in their mass spectra. However, it was not until 2000 when this problem was reframed as a solution, when Hill and coworkers used an electrospray to ionize molecules in the gas phase, and named the technique Secondary Electrospray Ionization. In 2007, the almost simultaneous works of Zenobi and Pablo Sinues applied SESI to breath analysis for the first time, marking the beginning of a fruitful field or research. With sensitivities in the low ppt_{v} range (10^{−12}), SESI has been used in other applications, where the detection of low volatility vapors is important.

Detecting low volatility species in the gas phase is important because larger molecules tend to have higher biological significance. Low volatility species have been overlooked because it is technically difficult to detect them, as they are in very low concentration, and they tend to condensate in the inner piping of instruments. However, as this problem is solved, and new instruments are able to handle larger and more specific molecules, the ability to perform on-line, real time analysis of molecules naturally released in the air, even at minute concentrations, is attracting attention to this ionization technique.

== Principle of operation ==
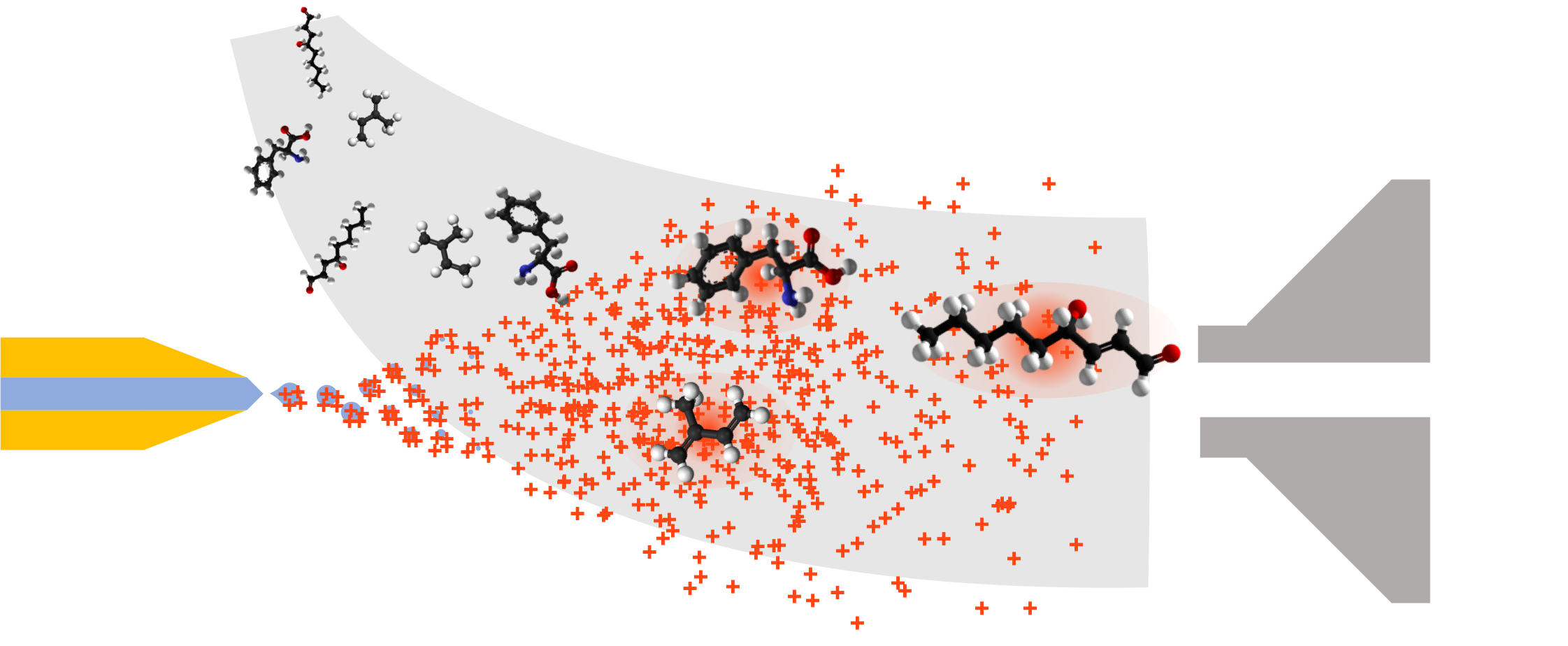
Secondary electrospray ionization mechanism diagram

In the early days of SESI, two ionization mechanisms were under debate.: the droplet-vapor interaction model postulates that vapors are adsorbed in the electrospray ionization (ESI) droplets, and then reemitted as the droplet shrinks, just as regular liquid phase analytes are produced in electrospray ionization; on the other hand, the ion-vapor interaction model postulates that molecules and ions or small clusters collide, and the charge is transferred in this collision. Currently available commercial SESI sources operate at high temperature so as to better handle low volatility species. In this regime, nanodroplets from the electrospray evaporate very quickly to form ion clusters in equilibrium. This results in ion-vapor reactions dominating the majority of the ionization region. As charging ions originate from nano-droplets, and no high energy ions are involved at any point of the ionization process nor the creation of ionizing agents, fragmentation in SESI is remarkably low, and the resulting spectra are very clean. This allows for a very high dynamic range, where low intensity peaks are not affected by more abundant species.

Some related techniques are laser ablation electrospray ionization, proton-transfer-reaction mass spectrometry and selected-ion flow-tube mass spectrometry.

== Applications ==
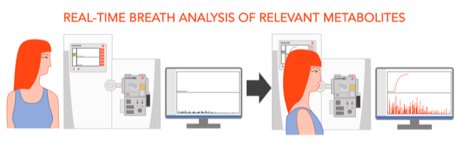
Real-time breath analysis

The main feature of SESI is that it can detect minuscule concentrations of low volatility species in real time, with molecular masses as high as 700 Da, falling in the realm of metabolomics. These molecules are naturally released by living organisms, and are commonly detected as odors, which means that they can be analyzed non-invasively. SESI, combined with High Resolution Mass Spectrometry, provides time-resolved, biologically relevant information of living systems, where the system does not need to be interfered with. This allows to seamlessly capture the time evolution of their metabolism and their response to controlled stimuli.

SESI has been widely used for breath gas analysis for biomarker discovery, and in vivo pharmacokinetic studies:

=== Biomarker discovery ===
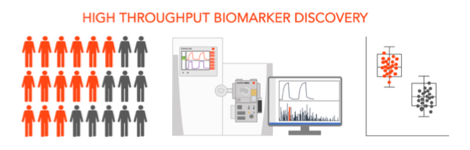
Biomarker discovery

==== Bacterial infection ====
It has been widely reported the identification of bacteria by their volatile organic compound fingerprint. SESI-MS has proven to be a robust technique for the identification of bacteria from cell cultures and infections in vivo from breath samples, after the development of libraries of vapor profiles. Other studies include: In vivo differentiation between critical pathogens Staphylococcus aureus and Pseudomonas aeruginosa. or differential detection among antibiotic resistant S. aureus and its non-resistant strains. Bacterial infection detection from other fluids such as saliva have also been reported.

==== Respiratory diseases ====
Many chronic respiratory diseases lack of an appropriate method of monitoring and differentiation among disease stages. SESI-MS has been used to diagnose and distinguish exacerbations from breath samples in chronic obstructive pulmonary disease. Metabolic profiling of breath samples has accurately differentiated healthy individuals from idiopathic pulmonary fibrosis or obstructive sleep apnea patients.

==== Cancer ====
SESI-MS is being studied as a non-invasive detection system of cancer biomarkers in breath. A preliminary study differentiates patients suffering from breast neoplasia.

==== Skin ====
Volatiles released from the skin can be detected by sampling the ambient gas surrounding it, providing a fast method for detecting metabolic changes in fatty acids composition patterns.

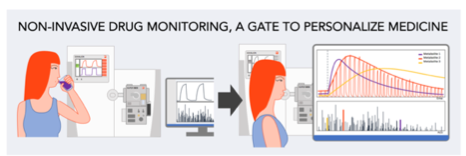
Non-invasive drug monitoring

=== Pharmacokinetics ===
To study pharmacokinetics, it is necessary a robust technique because of the complex nature of the samples' matrix, be it plasma, urine, or breath. Recent studies show that secondary electrospray ionization (SESI) is a powerful technique to monitor drug kinetics via breath analysis. Because breath is naturally produced, several datapoints can be readily collected. This allows for the number of collected data-points to be greatly increased. In animal studies, this approach SESI can reduce animal sacrifice while yielding pharmacokinetic curves with unmatched time resolutions. In humans, SESI-MS non-invasive analysis of breath can help study the kinetics of drugs at a personalized level. Monitoring exogenously introduced species allows tracking their specific metabolic pathway, which reduces the risk of picking confounding factors.

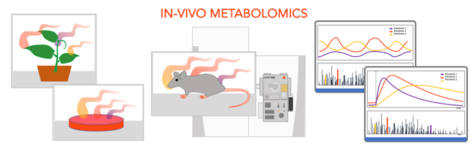
In-vivo metabolomics

==== Time-resolved metabolic analysis ====
Introducing known stimuli, such as specific metabolites isotopically labeled compounds, or other sources of stress triggers metabolic changes which can be easily monitored with SESI-MS. Some examples if this include: cell culture volatile compounds profiling; and metabolic studies for plant or trace human metabolic pathways.

==== Other applications ====
Other applications developed with SESI-MS include:

- Detection of illicit drugs;
- Detection of explosives;
- Food quality control monitoring.
