= Atmospheric-pressure chemical ionization =

Ionization method

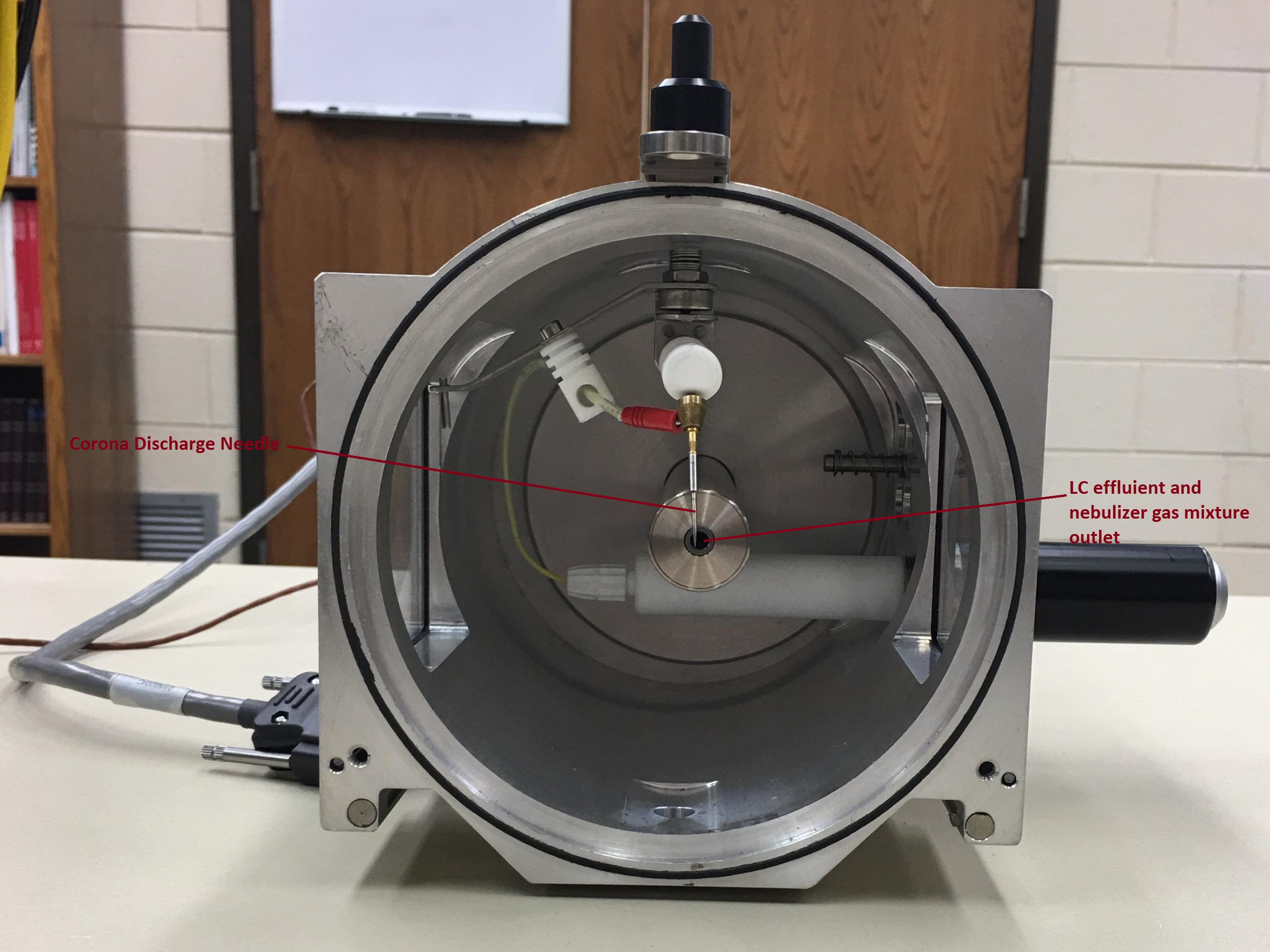
Atmospheric pressure chemical ionization chamber cross section

Atmospheric pressure chemical ionization (APCI) is an ionization method used in mass spectrometry which utilizes gas-phase ion-molecule reactions at atmospheric pressure (10^{5} Pa), commonly coupled with high-performance liquid chromatography (HPLC). APCI is a soft ionization method similar to chemical ionization where primary ions are produced on a solvent spray. The main usage of APCI is for polar and relatively less polar thermally stable compounds with molecular weight less than 1500 Da. The application of APCI with HPLC has gained a large popularity in trace analysis detection such as steroids, pesticides and also in pharmacology for drug metabolites.

== Instrument structure ==
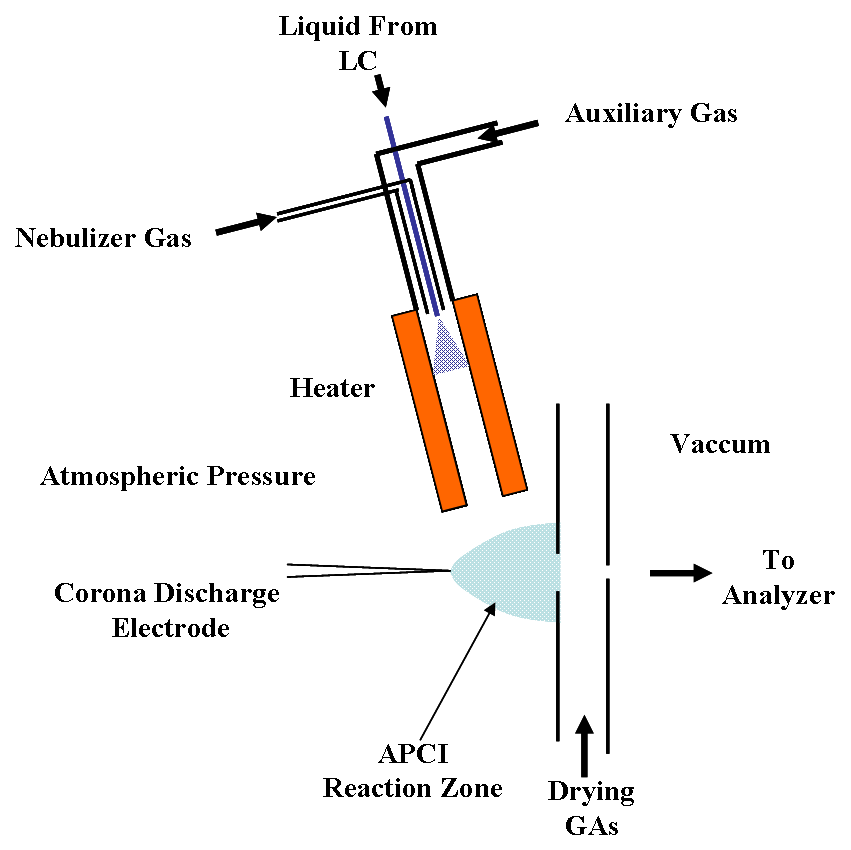
APCI source with heated nebulizer LC inlet

A typical APCI source usually consists of three main parts: a sample inlet, a corona discharge needle, and an ion transfer region under intermediate pressure. In the case of the heated nebulizer inlet from an LC, as shown in the figure, the eluate flows at 0.2 to 2.0 mL/min into a pneumatic nebulizer which creates a mist of fine droplets. Droplets are vaporized by impact with the heated walls at 350–500 °C and carried by the nebulizer gas and an auxiliary gas into the ion molecule reaction region between the corona electrode and the exit counter-electrode. A constant current of 2–5 microamps is maintained from the corona needle. Sample ions are produced by ion-molecule reactions (as described below), and pass through a small orifice or tube into the ion transfer region leading to the mass spectrometer.

Various geometries of ion source are possible, depending on application. When used with liquid chromatography, particularly at higher flow rates, the nebulizer is often positioned orthogonal to (or at a similarly steep angle to) the inlet of the mass spectrometer, so that solvent and neutral material does not contaminate the actual inlet of the mass spectrometer.

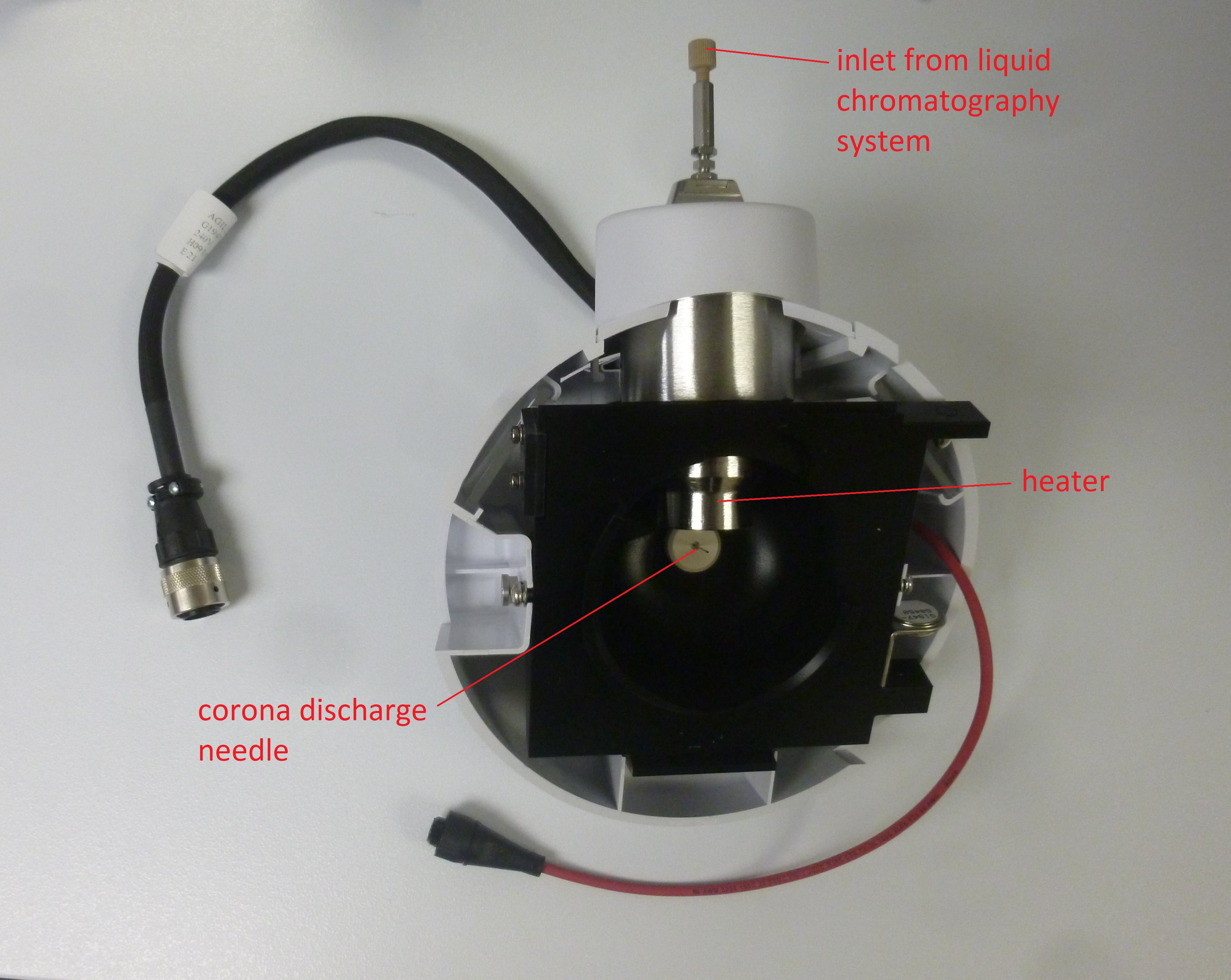
Atmospheric pressure chemical ionization (APCI) spray chamber from LC-MS; this ion source (spray chamber) would fit onto a mass spectrometer on the side facing the viewer, with the mass spectrometer's inlet at roughly the level of the corona discharge needle

== Ionization mechanism ==
Ionization in the gas phase by APCI follows the sequences: sample in solution, sample vapor, and sample ions. The effluent from the HPLC is evaporated completely. The mixture of solvent and sample vapor is then ionized by ion-molecule reaction.

The ionization can either be carried out in positive or negative ionization mode. In the positive mode, the sample can be ionized via protonation, adduct formation, charge transfer, and hydride abstraction depending on the nature of the reactant ion (hydronium, ammonium, or NO^{+} ion) and energetic and structural properties of the sample molecules. In the presence of ammonium as the reactant ion, the relative proton affinities of the reactant ions and the gaseous analyte molecules allow either proton transfer to produce [M+H]^{+} or ammonium adduct formation. In the negative mode, [M−H]^{−} ions are produced by either proton abstraction, or [M+X]^{−} ions are produced by anion attachment. Most work on the APCI-MS analysis has been in positive mode.

In the positive mode, when the discharge current of corona discharge is 1-5 μA on the nebulized solvent, N_{2} gas molecules are excited and ionized, which produce N_{4}^{+*}. The evaporated mobile phase of LC acts as the ionization gas and reactant ions. If water is the only solvent in the evaporated mobile phase, the excited nitrogen molecular ions N_{4}^{+*} would react with H_{2}O molecules to produce water cluster ions H^{+}(H_{2}O)_{n}. Then, analyte molecules M are protonated by the water cluster ions. Finally, the ionization products MH^{+}(H_{2}O)_{m} transfer out from the atmospheric-pressure ion source. Declustering (removal of water molecules from the protonated analyte molecule) of MH^{+}(H_{2}O)_{m} takes place at the high vacuum of the mass analyzer. The analyte molecule ions detected by MS are [M+H]^{+}. The chemical reactions of ionization process are shown below.

Primary and secondary reagent ion formation in a nitrogen atmosphere in the presence of water:

N_{2} + e → N_{2}^{+} + 2e

N_{2}^{+*} + 2N_{2} → N_{4}^{+*} + N_{2}

N_{4}^{+} + H_{2}O → H_{2}O^{+} + 2N_{2}

H_{2}O^{+} + H_{2}O → H_{3}O^{+} + OH^{•}

H_{3}O^{+} + H_{2}O + N_{2} → H^{+}(H_{2}O)_{2} + N_{2}

H^{+}(H_{2}O)_{n-1} + H_{2}O + N_{2} → H^{+}(H_{2}O)_{n} + N_{2}

Ionization of product ions:

H^{+}(H_{2}O)_{n} + M → MH^{+}(H_{2}O)_{m} + (n-m)H_{2}O

Declustering in the high vacuum of the mass analyzer:

MH^{+}(H_{2}O)_{m} → MH^{+} + mH_{2}O

If the mobile phase contains solvents with a higher proton affinity than water, proton-transfer reactions take place that lead to protonated the solvent with higher proton affinity. For example, when methanol solvent is present, the cluster solvent ions would be CH_{3}OH_{2}^{+}(H_{2}O)_{n}(CH_{3}OH)_{m}. Fragmentation does not normally occur inside the APCI source. If a fragment ion of a sample is observed, thermal degradation has taken place by the heated nebulizer interface, followed by the ionization of the decomposition products.

In a major distinction from chemical ionization, the electrons needed for the primary ionization are not produced by a heated filament, as a heated filament cannot be used under atmospheric pressure conditions. Instead, the ionization must occur using either corona discharges or β- particle emitters, which are both electron sources capable of handling the presence of corrosive or oxidizing gases.

== History ==
The origins of atmospheric pressure chemical ionization sources combined with mass spectrometry can be found in the 1960s in studies of ions in flames and of ion chemistry in corona discharges up to atmospheric pressure. The first application of APCI combined with mass spectrometry for trace chemical analysis was by the Franklin GNO Corporation who in 1971 developed an instrument combining APCI with ion mobility and mass spectrometry. Horning, Carroll and their co-workers in the 1970s at the Baylor College of Medicine (Houston, TX) demonstrated the advantages of APCI for coupling gas chromatography (GC) and liquid chromatography (LC) to a mass spectrometer. High sensitivity and simple mass spectra were shown in these studies. For LC-MS, the LC eluate was vaporized and ionized in a heated metal block. Initially, a ^{63}Ni foil was used as a source of electrons to perform ionization. In 1975, a corona discharge electrode was developed, providing a larger dynamic response range. APCI with the corona discharge electrode became the model for modern commercially available APCI interfaces.

In the late 1970s an APCI mass spectrometer system (the TAGA, for Trace Atmospheric Gas Analyzer), mounted in a van for mobile operation, was introduced by SCIEX, providing high sensitivity for monitoring polar organics in ambient air in real time. In 1981 a triple quadrupole mass spectrometer version was produced, allowing real-time direct air monitoring by APCI-MS/MS. A similar platform was used for the SCIEX AROMIC system (part of the CONDOR contraband detection system developed together with British Aerospace) for the detection of drugs, explosives and alcohol in shipping containers at border crossings, by sampling the interior airspace.

In the mid-1980s and into the early 1990s, the advantages of performing LC/MS with APCI and with electrospray, both atmospheric pressure ionization techniques, began to capture the attention of the analytical community. Together they have dramatically expanded the role of mass spectrometry in the pharmaceutical industry for both drug development and drug discovery applications. The sensitivity of APCI combined with the specificity of LC-MS and LC-MS/MS often makes it the method of choice for the quantification of drugs and drug metabolites.

== Advantages ==
Ionization of the substrate is very efficient as it occurs at atmospheric pressure, and thus has a high collision frequency. Additionally, APCI considerably reduces the thermal decomposition of the analyte because of the rapid desolvation and vaporization of the droplets in the initial stages of the ionization. This combination of factors most typically results in the production of ions of the molecular species with fewer fragmentations than many other ionization methods, making it a soft ionization method.

Another advantage to using APCI over other ionization methods is that it allows for the high flow rates typical of standard bore HPLC (0.2–2.0 mL/min) to be used directly, often without diverting the larger fraction of volume to waste. Additionally, APCI can often be performed in a modified ESI source. The ionization occurs in the gas phase, unlike ESI, where the ionization occurs in the liquid phase. A potential advantage of APCI is that it is possible to use a nonpolar solvent as a mobile phase solution, instead of a polar solvent, because the solvent and molecules of interest are converted to a gaseous state before reaching the corona discharge needle. Because APCI involves a gas-phase chemistry, there is no need to use special conditions such as solvents, conductivity, pH for LC. APCI appears to be more versatile LC/MS interface and more compatible with reversed-phase LC than ESI.

== Application ==
APCI is suited for thermal stable samples with low to medium (less than 1500 Da) molecular weight, and low to medium polarity. It is particularly useful for analytes that are not sufficiently polar for electrospray. The application area of APCI is the analysis of drugs, nonpolar lipids, natural compounds, pesticides and various organic compounds, but it is of limited use in the analysis of biopolymers, organometallics, ionic compounds and other labile analytes.

== See also ==
- Chemical ionization
- Corona discharge
- Electrospray ionization
- Secondary electrospray ionization
