= Spark ionization =

Ionization method to produce gas phase ions from a solid sample

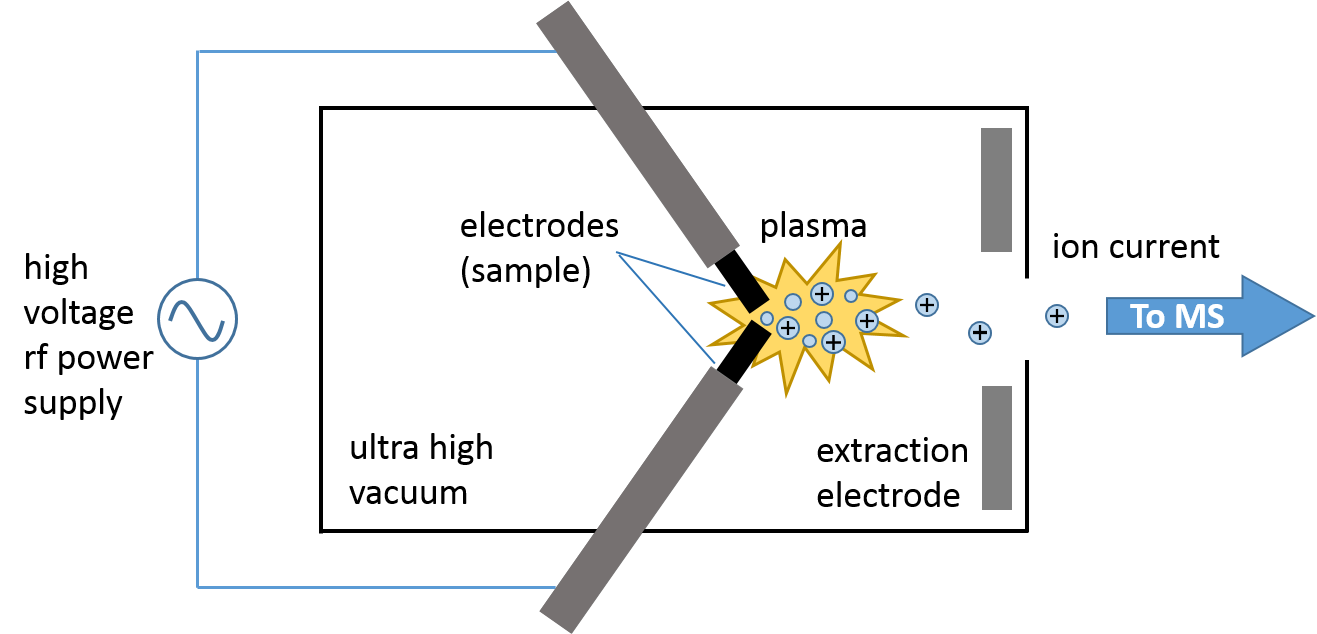
Schematic of Dempster's high-voltage radio-frequency spark ionization source

Spark ionization (also known as spark source ionization) is a method used to produce gas phase ions from a solid sample. The prepared solid sample is vaporized and partially ionized by an intermittent discharge or spark. This technique is primarily used in the field of mass spectrometry. When incorporated with a mass spectrometer the complete instrument is referred to as a spark ionization mass spectrometer or as a spark source mass spectrometer (SSMS).

== History ==
The use of spark ionization for analysis of impurities in solids was indicated by Dempster's work in 1935. Metals were a class of material that could not be previously ionized by thermal ionization (the method formerly used for ionizing solid sample). Spark ion sources were not commercially produced until after 1954 when Hannay demonstrated its capability for analysis of trace impurities (sub-part per million detection sensitivity) in semiconducting materials. The prototype spark source instrument was the MS7 mass spectrometer produced by Metropolitan-Vickers Electrical Company, Ltd. in 1959. Commercial production of spark source instruments continued throughout the 50s, 60s, and 70s, but they were phased out when other trace element detection techniques with improved resolution and accuracy were invented (circa 1960s). Successors of the spark ion source for trace element analysis are the laser ion source, glow discharge ion source, and inductively coupled plasma ion source. Today, very few laboratories use spark ionization worldwide.

== How it works ==
The spark ion source consists of a vacuum chamber containing the electrodes, which is called the spark housing. The tips of the electrodes are composed of or containing the sample and are electrically connected to the power supply. Extraction electrodes create an electric field that accelerate the generated ions through the exit slit.

=== Ion sources ===
For spark ionization, there exist two ion sources: the low-voltage direct-current (DC) arc source and the high-voltage radio-frequency (rf) spark source. The arc source has better reproducibility and the ions produced have a narrower energy spread compared to the spark source; however, the spark source has the ability to ionize both conducting and non-conducting samples while the arc source can only ionize conducting samples.

In the low-voltage DC arc source, a high voltage is applied to the two conducting electrodes to initiate the spark, followed by application of a low-voltage direct current to maintain an arc between the spark gap. The duration of the arc is usually only a few hundred microseconds to prevent overheating of the electrodes, and it repeated 50-100 times per second. This method can only be used to ionize conducting samples, e.g. metals.

The high-voltage rf spark source is the one that was used in commercial SSMS instruments due to its ability to ionize both conducting and non-conducting materials. Typically, samples are physically incorporated into two conductive electrodes between which an intermittent (1 MHz) high-voltage (50-100 kV using a Tesla transformer) electric spark is produced, ionizing the material at the tips of the pin-shaped electrodes. When the pulsed current is applied to the electrodes under ultra-high vacuum, a spark discharge plasma occurs in the spark gap in which ions are generated via electron impact. Within the discharge plasma, the sample evaporates, atomizes, and ionizes via electron impact. The total ion current may be optimized by adjusting the distance between the electrodes. This mode of ionization can be used to ionize conducting, semi-conducting, and non-conducting samples.

=== Sample preparation ===
Conducting and semi-conducting samples may be directly analyzed after being formed into electrodes. Non-conductive samples are first powdered, mixed with a conducting powder (usually high purity graphite or silver), homogenized, and then formed into electrodes. Even liquids can be analyzed if they are frozen or after impregnating a conducting powder. Sample homogeneity is important for reproducibility.

== Spark source mass spectrometry (SSMS) ==
The rf spark source creates ions with a wide energy spread (2-3 kV), which necessitates a double focusing mass analyzer. Mass analyzers are typically Mattauch-Herzog geometry, which achieve velocity and directional focusing onto a plane with either photosensitive plates for ion detection or linear channeltron detector arrays. SSMS has several unique features that make it a useful technique for various applications. Merits of SSMS include high sensitivity with detection limits in the ppb range, simultaneous detection of all elements in a sample, and simple sample preparation. However, the rf spark ion current is discontinuous and erratic, which results in fair resolution and accuracy when standards are not implemented. Other drawbacks include expensive equipment, long analysis time, and the need for highly trained personnel to analyze the spectrum.

== Applications of SSMS ==
Spark source mass spectrometry has been used for trace analysis and multielement analysis applications for highly conducting, semiconducting, and nonconducting materials. Some examples of SSMS applications are the trace element analysis of high-purity materials, multielement analysis of elements in technical alloys, geochemical and cosmochemical samples, biological samples, industrial stream samples, and radioactive material.
