= MasSpec Pen =

System to collect samples for cancer tests

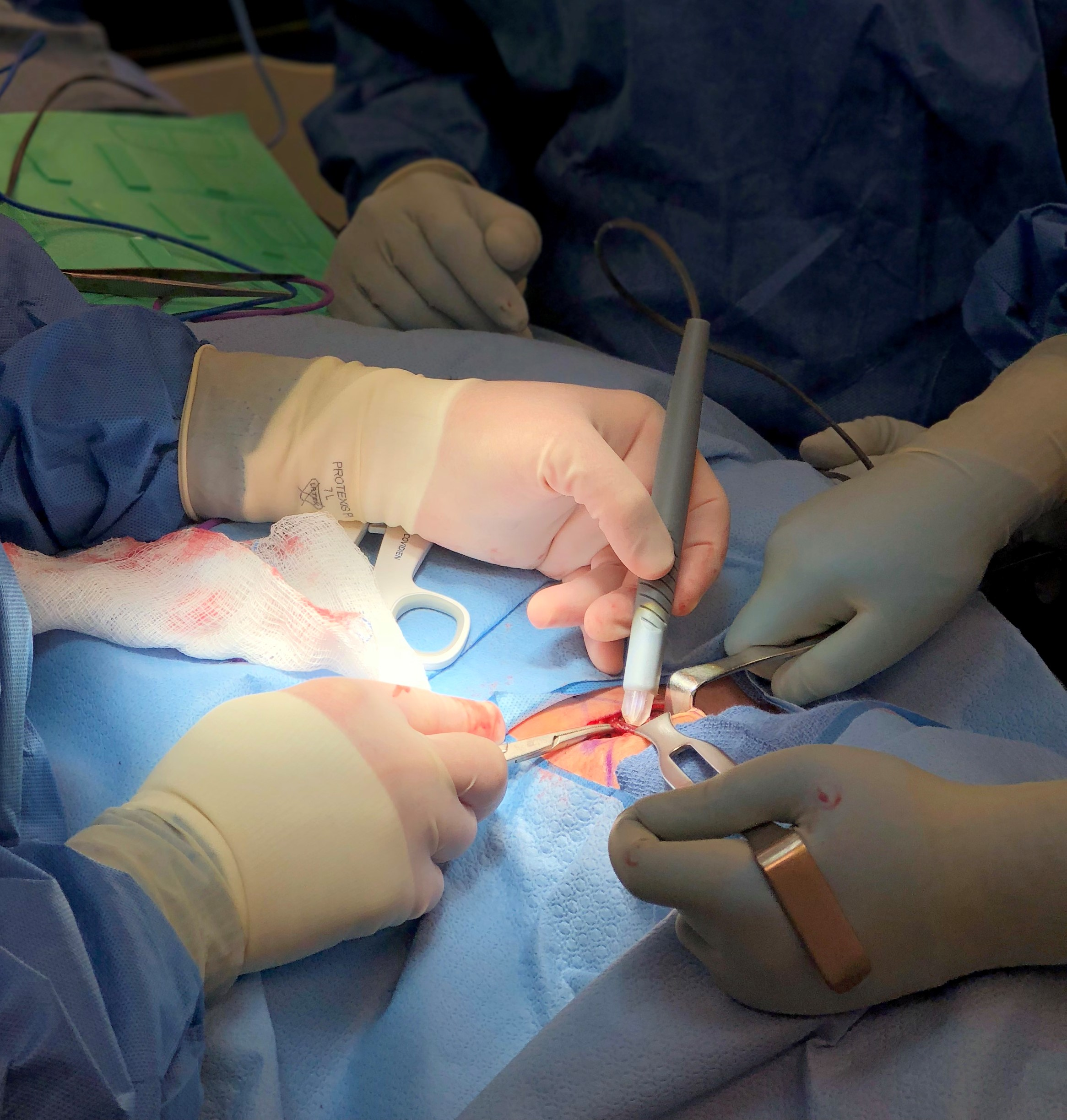
MasSpecPen

The MasSpec Pen is a mass spectrometry (MS) based cancer detection and diagnosis system that can be used for ex vivo and in vivo tissue sample analysis. The system collects biological molecules from a tissue sample surface via a solid-liquid extraction mechanism and transports the molecules to a mass spectrometer for analysis. The composition of the extracted molecules can then be used to predict if the tissue sample analyzed contains cancerous cells using machine learning algorithms and statistical models. In early-stage clinical research, the MasSpec Pen system was able to distinguish various cancer tissues, including thyroid, breast, lung, and ovarian tumor tissues, from their normal counterparts with an overall accuracy of 96.3%. A follow-up study in illustrating the use of the device for detection of serous ovarian carcinoma in ex vivo tissue biopsies allowed for the discrimination of normal and cancerous ovarian samples with a clinical sensitivity and specificity of 94.0% and 94.4%, respectively.

== Development and current usage ==
Livia S. Eberlin, Ph.D., an Assistant Professor of Chemistry at the University of Texas at Austin, first reported the invention of the MasSpec Pen in 2017. Within her laboratory, the device has been used to analyze human tissue biopsies, including normal and cancerous breast, lung, ovarian, and thyroid samples. The MasSpec Pen is currently being evaluated for use on freshly excised tissue biopsies and for intraoperative use during oncology surgeries.

The MasSpec Pen has been licensed to Genio Technologies, Inc., a subsidiary of MS Pen Technologies, Inc.

== Principle of operation ==
=== Ambient ionization mass spectrometry for disease diagnosis ===
The MasSpec Pen technology is based on the principles of ambient ionization, in which ions are generated directly from a sample without need for extensive sample preparation or chromatographic separations. The MasSpec Pen can further be categorized as a solid-liquid extraction based ambient ionization method, described as methods that utilize a solvent system to gently extract molecules from a sample surface that are subsequently analyzed by a mass spectrometer. Desorption electrospray ionization (DESI) was the first liquid-based ambient ionization MS method. DESI employed a spray of charged solvent droplets to bombard a sample surface to desorb and ionize molecules from the sample surface, which are then directed towards and analyzed by a mass spectrometer. DESI-MS and other solvent-based ambient ionization MS methods has been widely employed for the analysis of small molecules, primarily metabolites and lipids, directly from biological tissue specimens to determine their molecular composition and leverage the mass spectral data acquired for diagnostic purposes. These methods have been deployed for the discrimination of normal and cancerous regions of tissue samples for many solid tumor indications, including breast, brain, prostate, ovarian, and colorectal, among others. Multivariate statistical analysis methods are often utilized to generate statistical models from the mass spectral data acquired from direct analysis of tissue samples to distinguish between healthy and diseased tissues.

=== MasSpec Pen analysis mechanism ===
The MasSpec Pen, initially described in 2017, is a solvent-based ambient ionization technique but differs from its predecessors due to the handheld nature of the device, allowing analysis of samples distant from the mass spectrometer in a geometry independent manner. The MasSpec Pen used a probe that can be manipulated by hand to direct the analysis. To use the system, the tip of the 'pen' is placed in contact with the surface to be sampled and the user triggers the initiation of a sampling procedure by pressing an integrated foot pedal. This signals a syringe pump to deliver a small aliquot of solvent through a polymer tube to a reservoir at the tip of the 'pen' that remains in contact with the sample. Analytes are then extracted from the sample into the solvent droplet by a solid-liquid extraction mechanism. After a 3 second extraction period, the droplet is aspirated into the mass spectrometer using the vacuum from the mass spectrometer as the vacuum source. Once inside the mass spectrometer, the analytes within the solvent droplet are de-solvated and ionized via an inlet ionization mechanism. The ionized molecules are then analyzed by the mass spectrometer analyzer and the mass spectrum resulting is generated.

=== Cancer diagnosis with the MasSpec Pen ===
The MasSpec Pen was designed to assist in the detection of positive surgical margins during solid tumor debulking procedures to assist in the complete excision of cancer surgeries. The device was initially used to analyze 253 human tissue biopsies, including normal and cancerous breast, lung, ovary, and thyroid tissues. The mass spectra obtained for each sample contained metabolites, lipids, and some proteins that were representative of the molecular composition of the tissue analyzed. The collected data for each tissue type was then used to develop statistical models that could discriminate between the normal and cancer samples of each tissue type. Leave-one-patient-out cross validation was used to evaluate the accuracy of the models for distinguishing the normal and cancer tissues based on their molecular profiles. The method allowed for diagnosis of the breast tissues with 95.6% accuracy, lung with 96.8% accuracy, and ovary with 94.7% accuracy. Statistical models also allowed for the discrimination of normal thyroid from papillary thyroid carcinomas with 97.8% accuracy and from follicular thyroid adenomas with 94.7% accuracy. The report also demonstrated the ability of the MasSpec Pen technology to detect cancer within regions of mixed tissue containing both normal and cancerous cells from an ovarian cancer sample. Finally, the authors demonstrated the use of this method for in vivo analysis of tumor tissues using an anesthetized murine model.

Performance of the MasSpec Pen for ovarian cancer diagnosis was further evaluated in a report published in 2019. The authors analyzed 160 human ovarian tissue samples, including 78 normal ovary and 82 serous carcinomas, with the MasSpec Pen and developed classification models to discriminate between the normal and cancer samples. The model was able to distinguish between the normal and cancerous ovarian samples with 98.3%, 100.0%, and 92.3% overall accuracy on a training, validation, and test set of samples. Further, the report evaluated the ability of the MasSpec Pen system to distinguish ovarian cancer from fallopian tube and peritoneum tissue, two of the most common sites for ovarian cancer metastasis. Accuracies of 87.9% and 92.6% were achieved for the discrimination of cancer from fallopian tube and peritoneum tissues, respectively.

The MasSpec Pen has also been implemented for the detection of pancreatic cancer during excision procedures. The MasSpec Pen was used on both ex vivo and in vivo tissue samples to discriminate between healthy pancreas and pancreatic tumor tissue. The device was also used to detect cancerous margins near adjacent structures of the pancreas such as the bile duct. The system was used in 18 pancreatic cancer surgeries and the data collected allowed the detection of cancerous tissue with high accuracy.
