= Ion-to-photon detector =

Mass spectrometry device

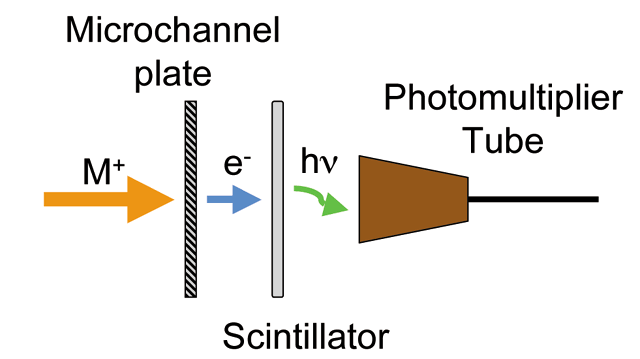
Schematic of an ion-to-photon detector with a conversion dynode.

An ion-to-photon detector (IPD) is a component used for detecting ions in mass spectrometry.

== Operation ==
In an ion-to-photon detector, a photomultiplier tube is coated with a layer of scintillator compound, such as Rhodamine B or CsI. When the ions pass through the mass analyzer of the spectrometer, they strike the scintillator compound and cause the release of photons. These photons are then detected by the photomultiplier tube. A conversion dynode, such as a microchannel plate can also be used between the ion beam and the scintillator to increase the signal. An MCP, when struck by an ion, will release electrons which then strike the scintillator.

== Applications ==
The primary application for ion-to-photon detectors is acting as the detector in MALDI mass spectrometry. They could, in theory, be used for other types of mass spectrometry as well.

== Comparison to other detectors ==
The conversion efficiency of ions to photons by an IPD is as good as, or better than, the conversion efficiency of ions to electrons by a multichannel plate detector. Ion-to-photon detectors may also detect ions with a mass of up to around 20,000 Da, better than microchannel plates. However, the resolution of the mass spectrum from an IPD equipped spectrometer is slightly lower. The noise in the spectrum, which may come from unfocused, slow speed ions, is also slightly higher.
