= Bioelectrospray =

Bio-electrospraying is a technology that enables the deposition of living cells on various targets with a resolution that depends on cell size and not on the jetting phenomenon. It is envisioned that "unhealthy cells would draw a different charge at the needle from healthy ones, and could be identified by the mass spectrometer", with tremendous implications in the health care industry.

The early versions of bio-electrosprays were employed in several areas of research, most notably self-assembly of carbon nanotubes. Although the self-assembly mechanism is not clear yet, "elucidating electrosprays as a competing nanofabrication route for forming self-assemblies with a wide range of nanomaterials in the nanoscale for top-down based bottom-up assembly of structures." Future research may reveal important interactions between migrating cells and self-assembled nanostructures. Such nano-assemblies formed by means of this top-down approach could be explored as a bottom-up methodology for encouraging cell migration to those architectures for forming cell patterns to nano-electronics, which are a few examples, respectively.

After initial exploration with a single protein, increasingly complex systems were studied by bio-electrosprays. These include, but are not limited to, neuronal cells, stem cells, and even whole embryos. The potential of the method was demonstrated by investigating cytogenetic and physiological changes of human lymphocyte cells as well as conducting comprehensive genetic, genomic and physiological state studies of human cells and cells of the model yeast Saccharomyces cerevisiae.

== See also ==
- Electrospray ionization
