= Arthur Jeffrey Dempster =

Canadian-American physicist (1886–1950)

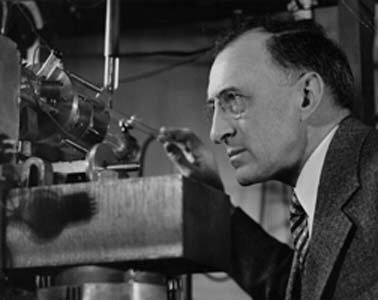
- Dempster, c. 1925-30
- Born: August 14, 1886; Toronto, Ontario, Canada
- Died: March 11, 1950 (aged 63); Stuart, Florida, U.S.
- Education: B.S. University of Toronto; M.S. University of Toronto; Ph.D. University of Chicago
- Known for: Developed the first modern mass spectrometer, discovered ^{235}U (the fissile isotope of uranium)
- Awards: Newcomb Cleveland Prize (1929)
- Scientific career
- Fields: Physics

External videos
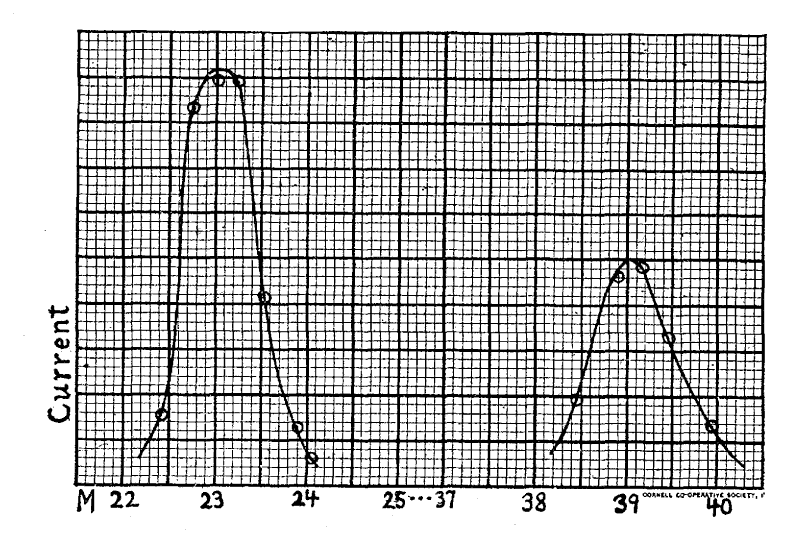
- Michael A. Grayson, Discovery of Isotopes of Elements (Part I: Arthur Jeffrey Dempster), Profiles in Chemistry, Chemical Heritage Foundation

Arthur Jeffrey Dempster (August 14, 1886 – March 11, 1950) was a Canadian-American physicist best known for his work in mass spectrometry and his discovery in 1935 of the uranium isotope ^{235}U. As part of his research, he investigated the isotopic constitution of multiple other elements.

== Early life and education ==
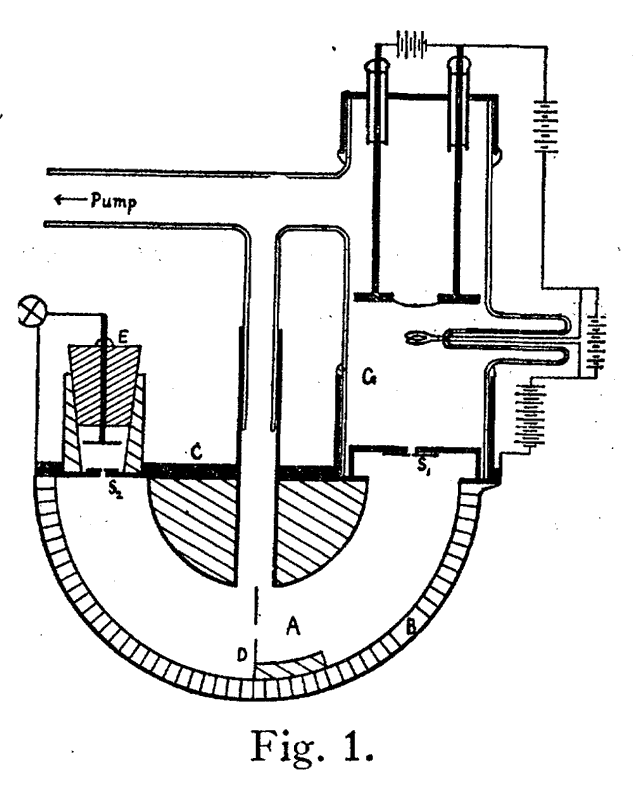
Dempster's 180 degree magnetic sector mass analyzer.

Dempster was born in Toronto, Ontario, Canada. He received his bachelor's and master's degrees at the University of Toronto in 1909 and 1910, respectively. After spending a semester each at Gottingen and Munich, Germany, and two years at the University of Wurzburg under Wilhelm Wien he left at the outset of World War I for the United States; there he completed his Ph.D. in physics, graduating summa cum laude, at the University of Chicago originally begun in Germany under Wien.

== Academic career ==
Dempster joined the physics faculty at the University of Chicago in 1916 and remained there until his death in 1950. He co-developed a double-focusing mass spectrograph in 1936 with the help of the Americans Kenneth T. Bainbridge and J.H.E. Mattauch of Austria. This apparatus allowed the measurement of the mass of atomic nuclei.

During World War II he worked on the secret Manhattan Project to develop the world's first atomic bomb.

Dempster used a mass spectrometer of his design, in 1935 to find uranium-235, an isotope of uranium which is lighter than uranium-238. The quantity of uranium-235 in naturally occurring uranium is only 0.7%.

Dempster was elected to the American Philosophical Society in 1932 and the United States National Academy of Sciences in 1937.

From 1943 to 1946, Dempster was chief physicist of the University of Chicago's Metallurgical Laboratory or "Met Lab" which integrally related to the Manhattan Project and was founded to study the materials necessary for the manufacture of atomic bombs.

In 1946, he took a position as a division director at the Argonne National Laboratory.

Dempster died on March 11, 1950, in Stuart, Florida, at the age of 63 of a myocardial infarction whilst on vacation.

== Research ==
In 1918, Dempster developed the first modern mass spectrometer, a scientific apparatus allowing physicists to identify compounds by the mass of elements in a sample, and determine the isotopic composition of elements in a sample. Dempster's mass spectrometer was over 100 times more accurate than previous versions, and established the basic theory and design of mass spectrometers that is still used to this day. Dempster's research over his career centered on the mass spectrometer and its applications, leading in 1935 to his discovery of the fissile uranium isotope ^{235}U. Dempster was also well known as an authority on positive rays.
