= Selected ion monitoring =

Selected ion monitoring (SIM) is a mass spectrometry scanning mode in which only a limited mass-to-charge ratio range is transmitted/detected by the instrument, as opposed to the full spectrum range. This mode of operation typically results in significantly increased sensitivity. Due to their inherent nature, this technique is most effective—and therefore most common—on quadrupole mass spectrometers, Orbitrap, and Fourier transform ion cyclotron resonance mass spectrometers.

== See also ==
- Selected reaction monitoring
