= Electrospinning =

Fiber production method

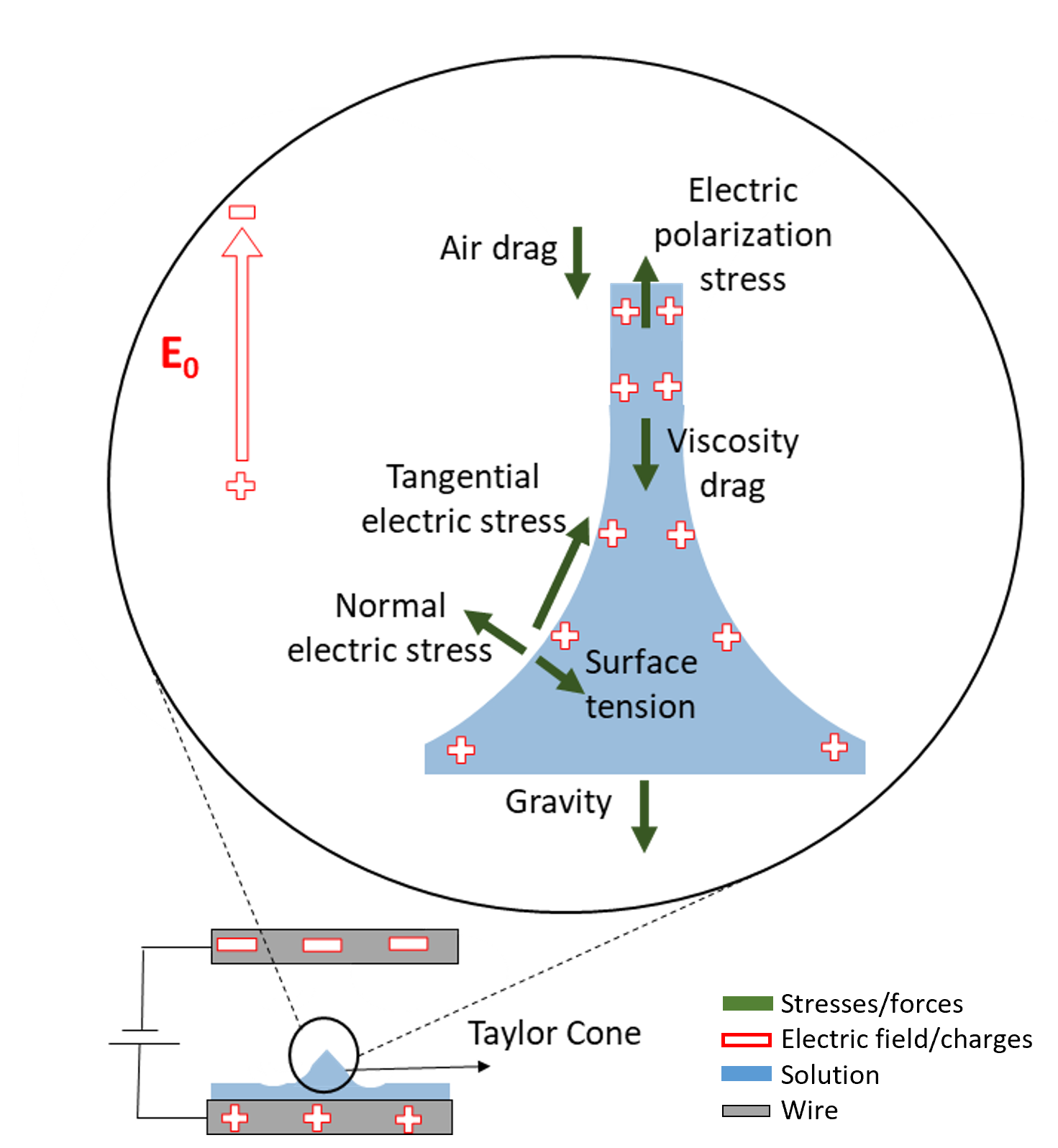
Taylor cone formation and the main forces acting on the solution, adapted from .

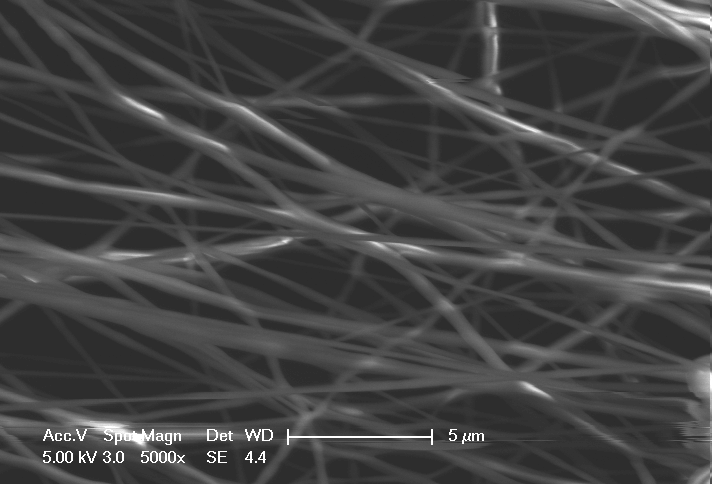
Scanning electron microscopy image of electrospun polycaprolactone fibers.

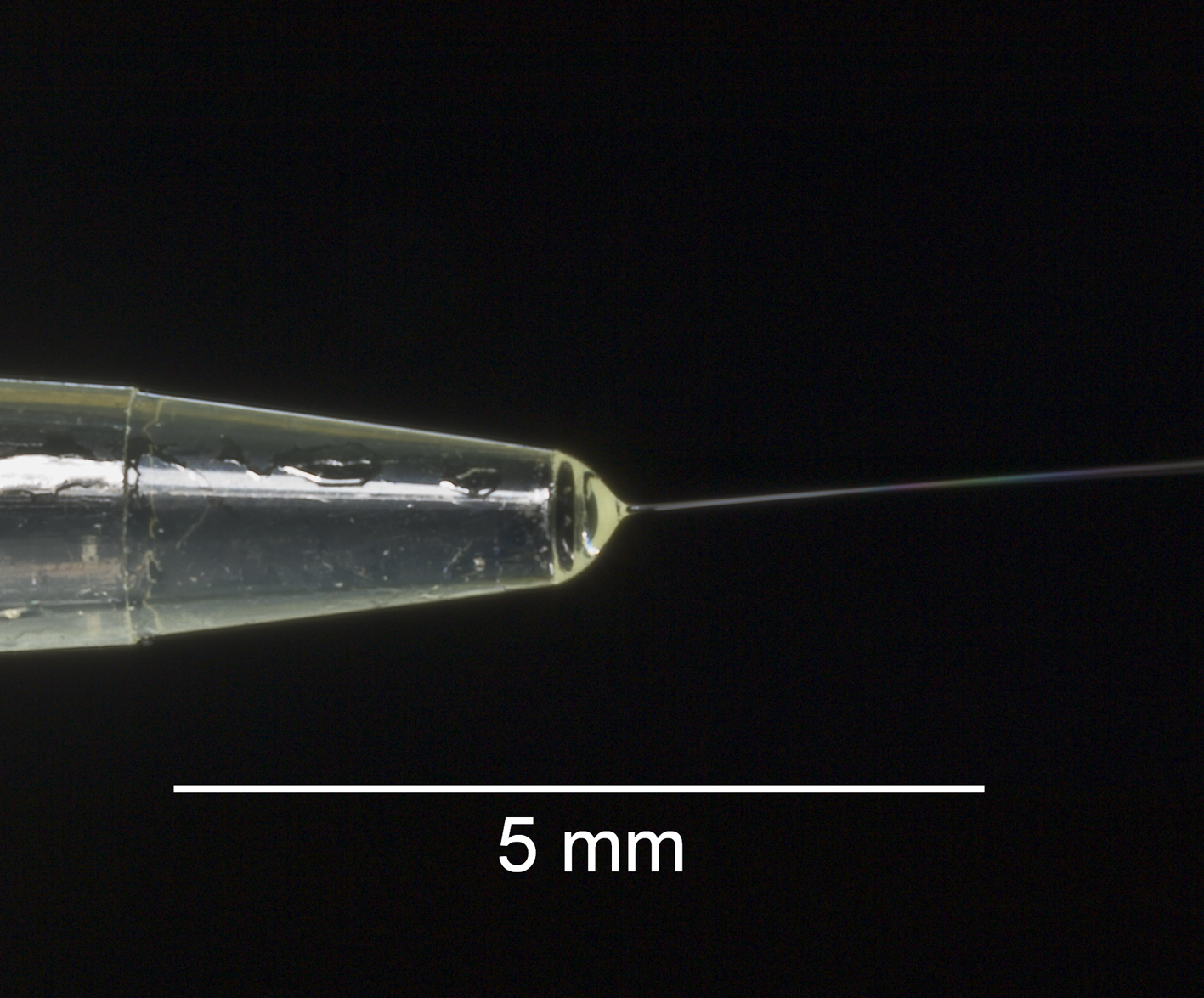
Photograph of a meniscus of polyvinyl alcohol in aqueous solution showing a fibre being electrospun from a Taylor cone.

Electrospinning is a fiber production method that uses electrical force (based on electrohydrodynamic principles) to draw charged threads of polymer solutions for producing nanofibers with diameters ranging from nanometers to micrometers. Electrospinning shares characteristics of both electrospraying and conventional solution dry spinning of fibers. The process does not require the use of coagulation chemistry or high temperatures to produce solid threads from solution. This makes the process particularly suited to the production of fibers using large and complex molecules. Electrospinning from molten precursors is also practiced; this method ensures that no solvent can be carried over into the final product.

== Process ==
When a sufficiently high voltage is applied to a liquid droplet, the body of the liquid becomes charged, and electrostatic repulsion counteracts the surface tension and the droplet is stretched; at a critical point a stream of liquid erupts from the surface. This point of eruption is known as the Taylor cone. If the molecular cohesion of the liquid is sufficiently high, stream breakup does not occur (if it does, droplets are electrosprayed) and a charged liquid jet is formed.

As the jet dries in flight, the mode of current flow changes from ohmic to convective as the charge migrates to the surface of the fiber. The jet is then elongated by a whipping process caused by electrostatic repulsion initiated at small bends in the fiber, until it is finally deposited on the grounded collector. The elongation and thinning of the fiber resulting from this bending instability leads to the formation of uniform fibers with nanometer-scale diameters.

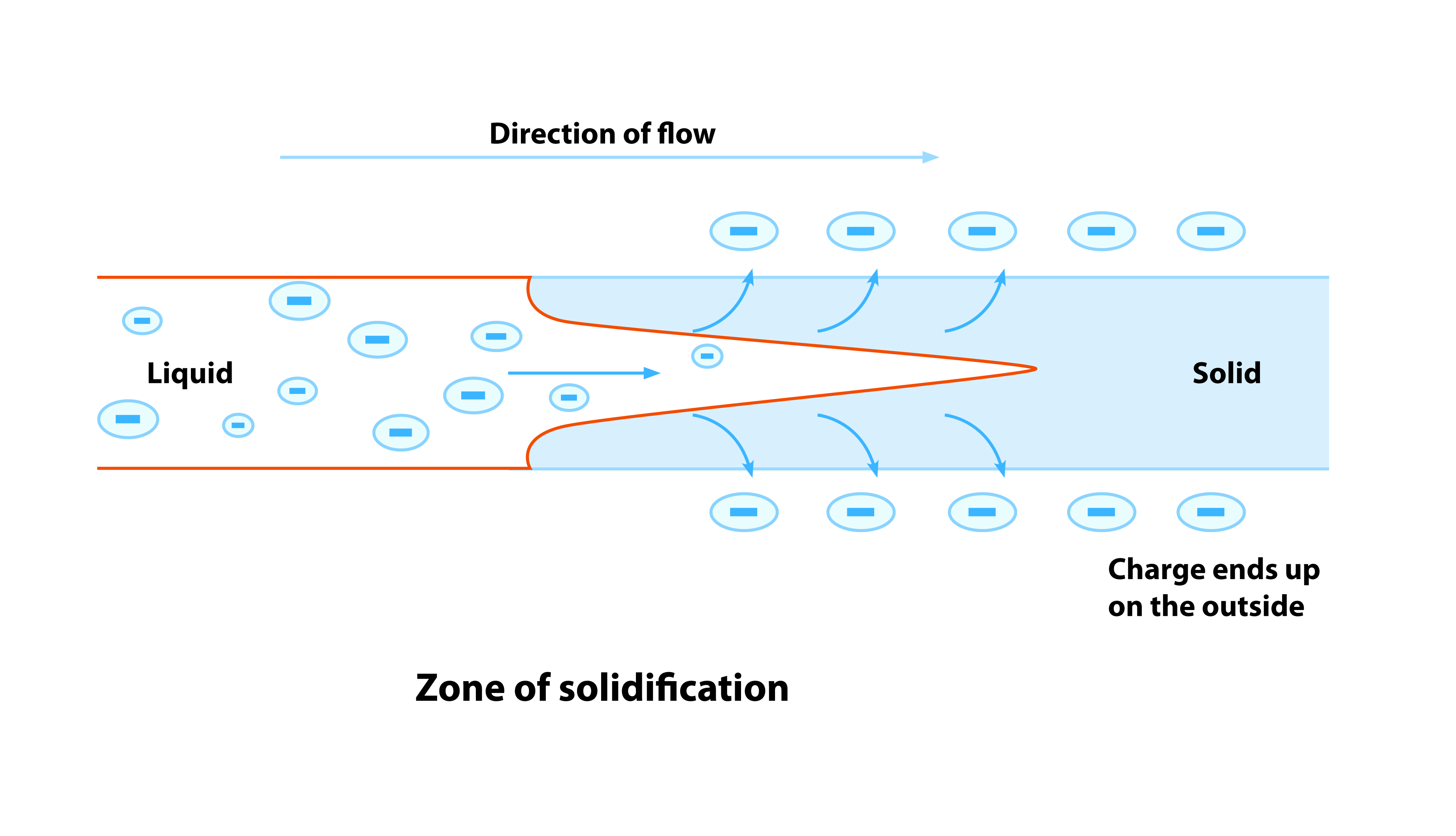
How the distribution of charge in the fibre changes as the fibre dries during flight

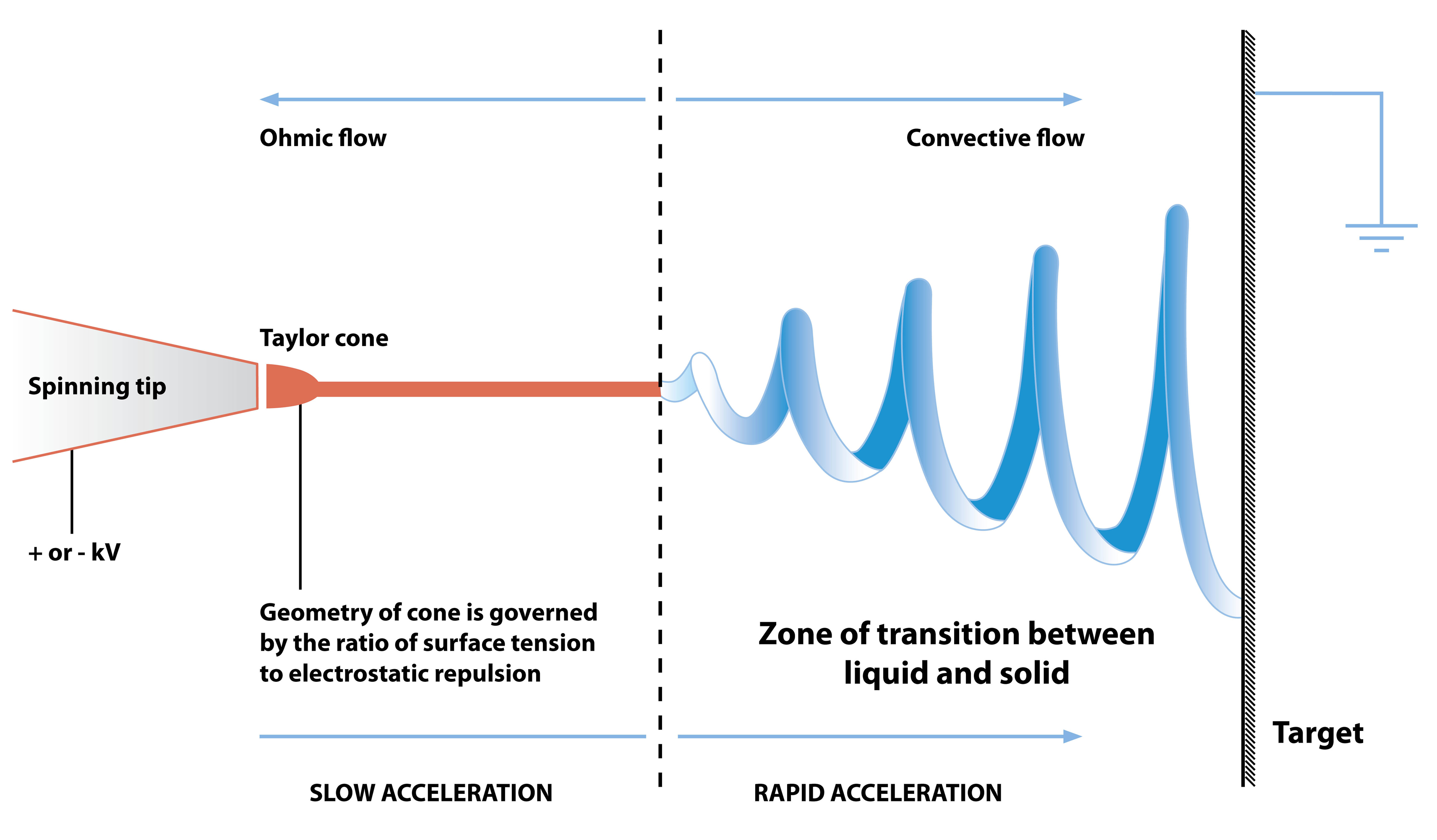
Diagram showing fibre formation by electrospinning

=== Parameters ===
- Molecular weight, molecular-weight distribution and architecture (branched, linear etc.) of the polymer
- Solution properties (viscosity, conductivity, and surface tension)
- Electric potential, flow rate and concentration
- Distance between the capillary and collection screen
- Ambient parameters (temperature, humidity and air velocity in the chamber)
- Motion and size of target screen (collector)
- Needle gauge

Effects of Electrospinning parameters.
Parameters	Effect on fibers	Linked to
Solution Parameters
Viscosity	If too low, no continuous fiber formation will occur; if too high, the ejection of the jet from the needle tip will be impeded.	Polymer concentration, Molecular Weight
Polymer Concentration	Increase in concentration results in increased diameter. A minimum concentration is required: if too low, there will not be enough entanglements to sustain the jet (beads).	Surface tension, Viscosity
Molecular weight	Reflects the number of entanglements of polymeric chains in solution, thus its viscosity.	Viscosity, Surface tension, Conductivity
Conductivity	Directly related to the accumulation of charges under the electric field. Higher conductivity results in stronger stretching of the jet producing smaller diameter fiber.	Voltage
Surface tension	With all other parameters fixed, it determines the upper and lower boundaries of the electrospinning window.	
Processing Parameters
Voltage	Fiber formation occurs only after a certain threshold voltage. Higher voltages cause greater stretching of the solution with reduction of fiber diameters; but if the voltage is too high, it may cause instability of the jet and increase the fiber diameter.	Tip to collector distance, Conductivity, Feed rate
Tip to collector distance	Affects the traveling time of the polymer jet; should be high enough to allow complete evaporation of the solvent.	Voltage, Feed rate
Feed rate	Determines the amount of solution available per unit of time. Influences the jet velocity and the material transfer rate. Increasing the rate causes more polymer to be processed at a given instant, thus increasing fiber diameter.	Tip to collector distance, Voltage, Viscosity
Ambient Parameters
Humidity	High humidity may result in pores on fiber surface	
Temperature	An increase in temperature results in a decrease in fiber diameter thanks to a decrease in viscosity.	Viscosity

=== Apparatus and range ===
The standard laboratory setup for electrospinning consists of a spinneret (typically a hypodermic syringe needle) connected to a high-voltage (5 to 50 kV) direct current power supply, a syringe pump, and a grounded collector. A polymer solution, sol-gel, particulate suspension or melt is loaded into the syringe and this liquid is extruded from the needle tip at a constant rate by a syringe pump. Alternatively, the droplet at the tip of the spinneret can be replenished by feeding from a header tank providing a constant feed pressure. This constant pressure type feed works better for lower viscosity feedstocks.

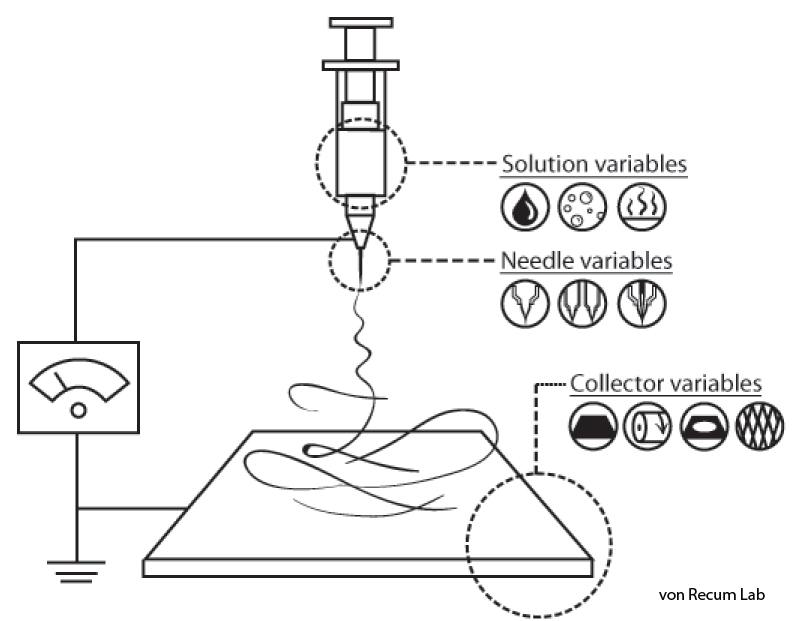
Electrospinning/electrospraying schematic with variations for different processing outcomes.

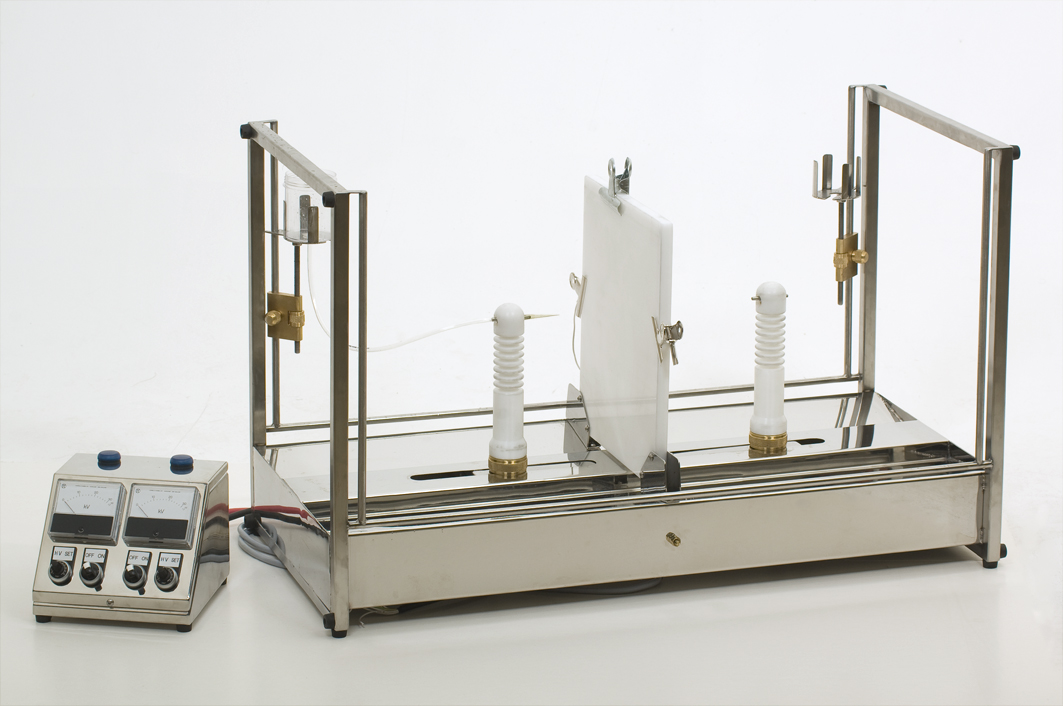
A constant pressure laboratory electrospinning machine (set up for horizontal fiber production)

=== Scaling-up possibilities ===
- Alternating current electrospinning
- Needleless (also known as nozzle-free) electrospinning Electrospun nanofibers are widely investigated for wound healing applications because their high surface area, interconnected porosity, and structural similarity to the extracellular matrix can support cell adhesion, proliferation, and tissue regeneration.
- Multiplying the needles
- High-throughput roller electrospinning
- Wire electrospinning
- Bubble electrospinning
- Ball electrospinning
- High speed electrospinning
- Plate edge electrospinning
- Bowl electrospinning
- Hollow tube electrospinning
- Rotary cone electrospinning
- Spiral coil electrospinning
- Electroblowing

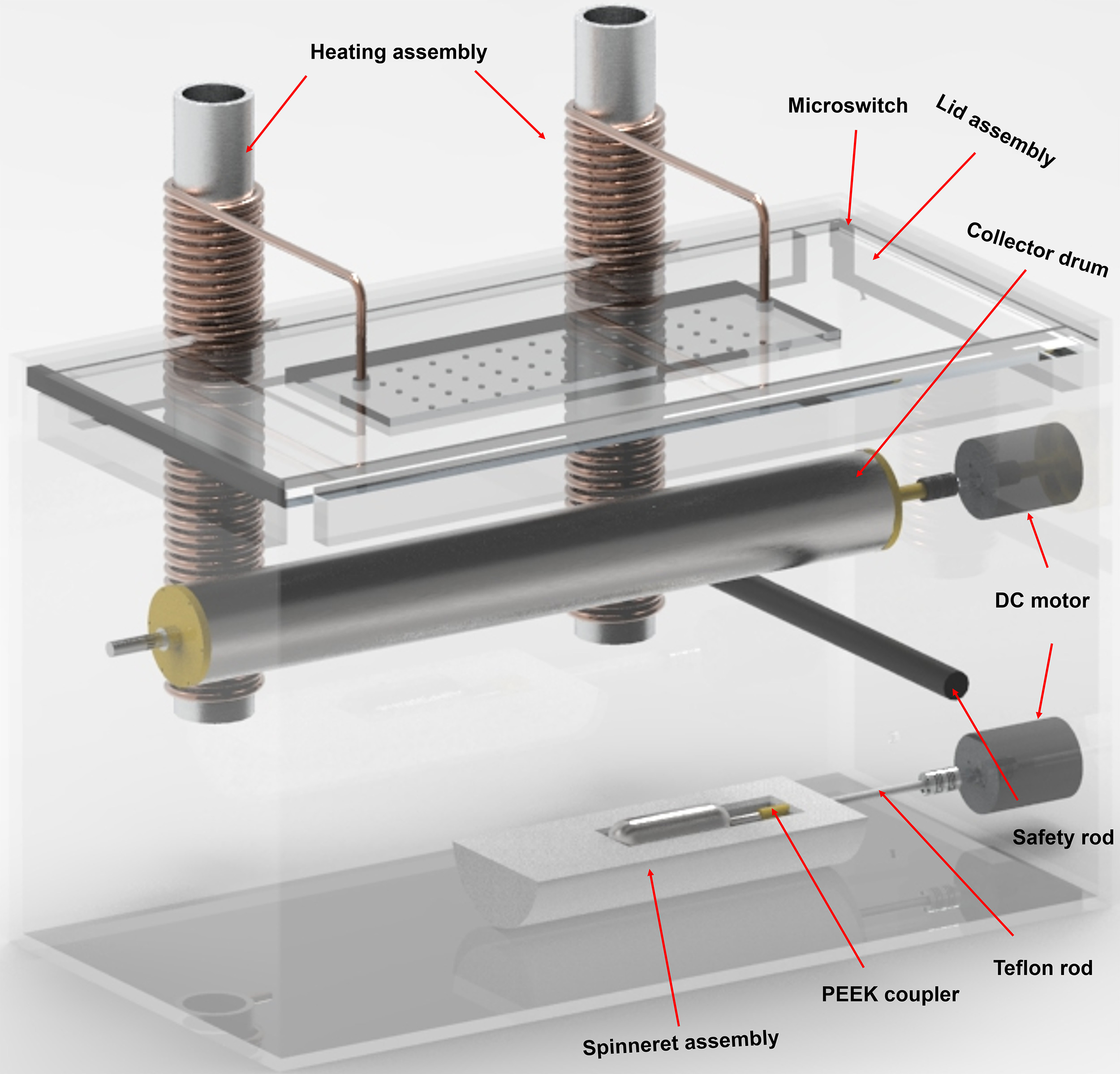
Schematic of an upward needleless roller electrospinning device. The setup comprises two oppositely charged rotating mandrels. A reservoir is used to finely coat the surface of the rotating spinneret (half-submerged, bottom mandrel) with a polymer solution layer. High-voltage is applied between the two mandrels, instigating the subsequent generation of fibers from the spinneret's surface. Due to the wider surface of the spinneret, high-throughput production is feasible.

== Other techniques ==
Modification of the spinneret and/or the type of solution can allow for the creation of fibers with unique structures and properties. Electrospun fibers can adopt a porous or core–shell morphology depending on the type of materials being spun as well as the evaporation rates and miscibility for the solvents involved. For techniques which involve multiple spinning fluids, the general criteria for the creation of fibers depends upon the spinnability of the outer solution. This opens up the possibility of creating composite fibers which can function as drug delivery systems or possess the ability to self-heal upon failure.

=== Co-axial electrospinning ===
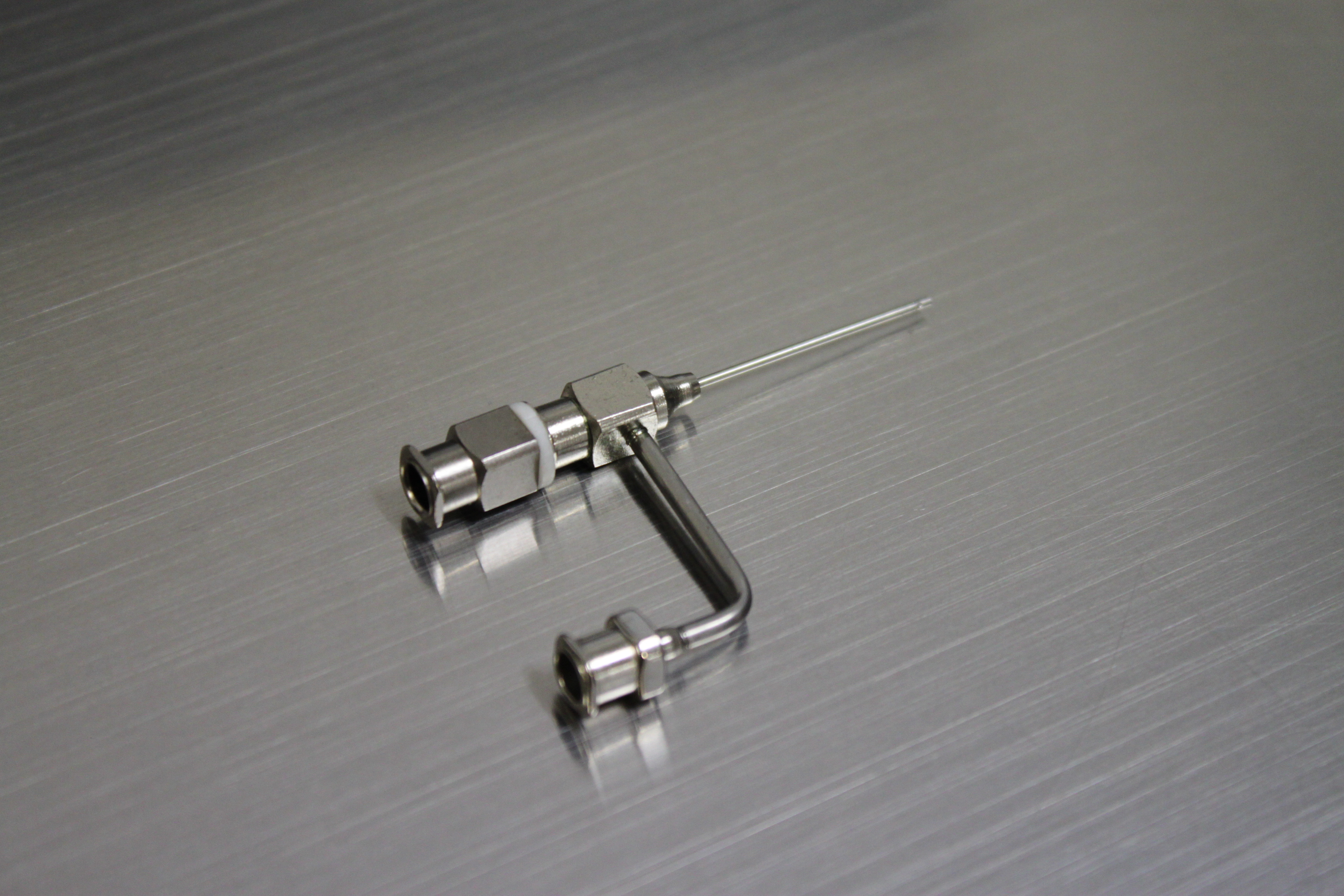
A stainless steel coaxial spinneret manufactured by ramé-hart instrument co., Succasunna, NJ.

A coaxial setup uses a dual-solution feed system which allows for the injection of one solution into another at the tip of the spinneret. The sheath fluid is believed to act as a carrier which draws in the inner fluid at the Taylor Cone of the electrospinning jet. If the solutions are immiscible then a core shell structure is usually observed. Miscible solutions however can result in porosity or a fiber with distinct phases due to phase separation during solidification of the fiber. For more advanced setups, a triaxial or quadaxial (tetra-axial) spinneret can be used with multiple solutions.

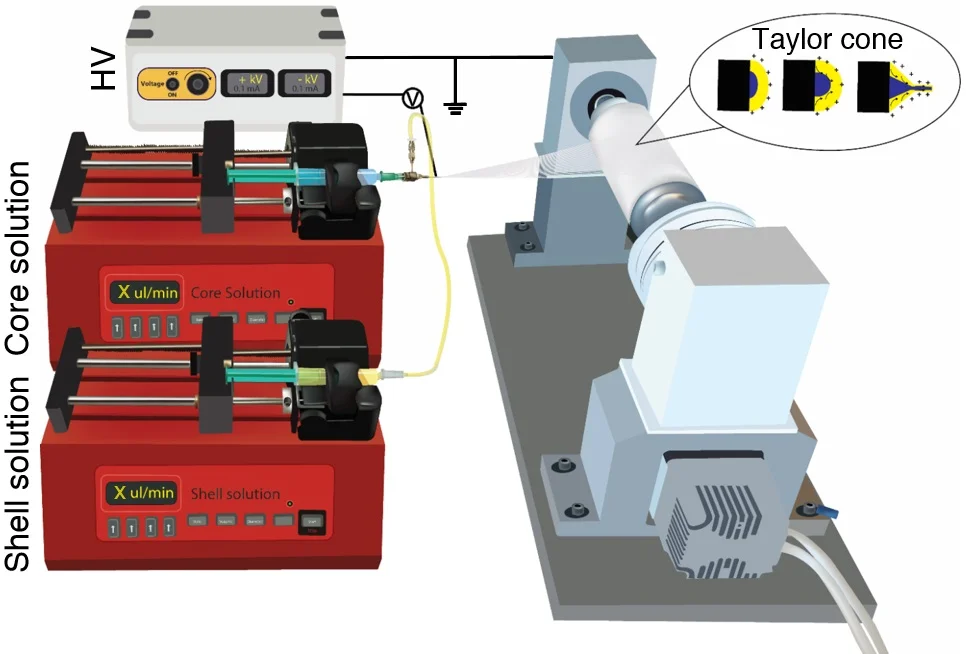
A typical co-axial electrospinning setup. Two concentrically parallel needles form the co-axial spinneret. A composite Taylor cone formulates at the orifice of the needle encompassing the two solutions, fed to the needle from two independent reservoirs (syringe pumps). In this example, a negatively charged mandrel is used as a collector. The positively charged core/shell nanofibers expand and solidify as they advance towards the collector's surface. Modified from Keirouz et al. (2020).

=== Emulsion electrospinning ===
Emulsions can be used to create core shell or composite fibers without modification of the spinneret. However, these fibers are typically more difficult to produce compared to coaxial spinning due to the greater number of variables which must be accounted for in creating the emulsion. A water phase and an immiscible solvent phase are mixed in the presence of an emulsifying agent to form the emulsion. Any agent which stabilizes the interface between the immiscible phases can be used. Surfactants such as sodium dodecyl sulfate, Triton X-100 and nanoparticles have been used successfully. During the electrospinning process the emulsion droplets within the fluid are stretched and gradually confined leading to their coalescence. If the volume fraction of inner fluid is sufficiently high, a continuous inner core can be formed.

Electrospinning of blends is a variation of this technique which uses the fact that polymers are generally immiscible with each and can phase segregate without the use of surfactants. This method can be simplified further if a solvent which dissolves both polymers is used.

=== Melt electrospinning ===
Electrospinning of polymer melts eliminates the need for volatile solvents in solution electrospinning. Semi crystalline polymer fibers such as PE, PET and PP, which would otherwise be impossible or very difficult to create using solution spinning, can be created. The setup is very similar to that employed in conventional electrospinning and includes the use of a syringe or spinneret, a high voltage supply and the collector. The polymer melt is usually produced by heating from either resistance heating, circulating fluids, air heating or lasers.

Due to the high viscosity of polymer melts, the fiber diameters are usually slightly larger than those obtained from solution electrospinning. The fiber uniformity upon achieving stable flow rates and thermal equilibrium, tends to be very good. The whipping instability which is the predominant stage in which the fiber is stretched for spinning from solutions can be absent from the process due to the low melt conductivity and high viscosity of the melt. The most significant factors which affect the fiber size tend to be the feed rate, the molecular weight of the polymer and the diameter of the spinneret. Fiber sizes ranging from ~250 nm to several hundreds of micrometers have been created thus far with the lower sizes being achieved using low molecular weight polymers.

== History ==
In the late 16th century William Gilbert set out to describe the behavior of magnetic and electrostatic phenomena. He observed that when a suitably electrically charged piece of amber was brought near a droplet of water it would form a cone shape and small droplets would be ejected from the tip of the cone: this is the first recorded observation of electrospraying.

In 1887 C. V. Boys described "the old, but little known experiment of electrical spinning". Boys' apparatus consisted of "a small dish, insulated and connected with an electrical machine". He found that as his stock liquid reached the edge of the dish, that he could draw fibers from a number of materials including shellac, beeswax, sealing-wax, gutta-percha and collodion.

The process of electrospinning was patented by J.F. Cooley in May 1900 and February 1902 and by W.J. Morton in July 1902.

In 1914 John Zeleny, published work on the behavior of fluid droplets at the end of metal capillaries. His effort began the attempt to mathematically model the behavior of fluids under electrostatic forces.

Further developments toward commercialization were made by Anton Formhals, and described in a sequence of patents from 1934 to 1944 for the fabrication of textile yarns. Electrospinning from a melt rather than a solution was patented by C.L. Norton in 1936 using an air-blast to assist fiber formation.

In 1938 Nathalie D. Rozenblum and Igor V. Petryanov-Sokolov, working in Nikolai A. Fuchs' group at the Aerosol Laboratory of the L. Ya. Karpov Institute in the USSR, generated electrospun fibers, which they developed into filter materials known as "Petryanov filters". By 1939, this work had led to the establishment of a factory in Tver' for the manufacture of electrospun smoke filter elements for gas masks. The material, dubbed BF (Battlefield Filter) was spun from cellulose acetate in a solvent mixture of dichloroethane and ethanol. By the 1960s output of spun filtration material was claimed as 20 million m^{2} per annum.

Between 1964 and 1969 Sir Geoffrey Ingram Taylor produced the theoretical underpinning of electrospinning. Taylor's work contributed to electrospinning by mathematically modeling the shape of the cone formed by the fluid droplet under the effect of an electric field; this characteristic droplet shape is now known as the Taylor cone. He further worked with J. R. Melcher to develop the "leaky dielectric model" for conducting fluids.

Simon, in a 1988 NIH SBIR grant report, showed that solution electrospinning could be used to produce nano- and submicron-scale polystyrene and polycarbonate fibrous mats specifically intended for use as in vitro cell substrates. This early application of electrospun fibrous lattices for cell culture and tissue engineering showed that various cell types would adhere to and proliferate upon the fibers in vitro. Small changes in the surface chemistry of the fibers were also observed depending upon the polarity of the electric field during spinning.

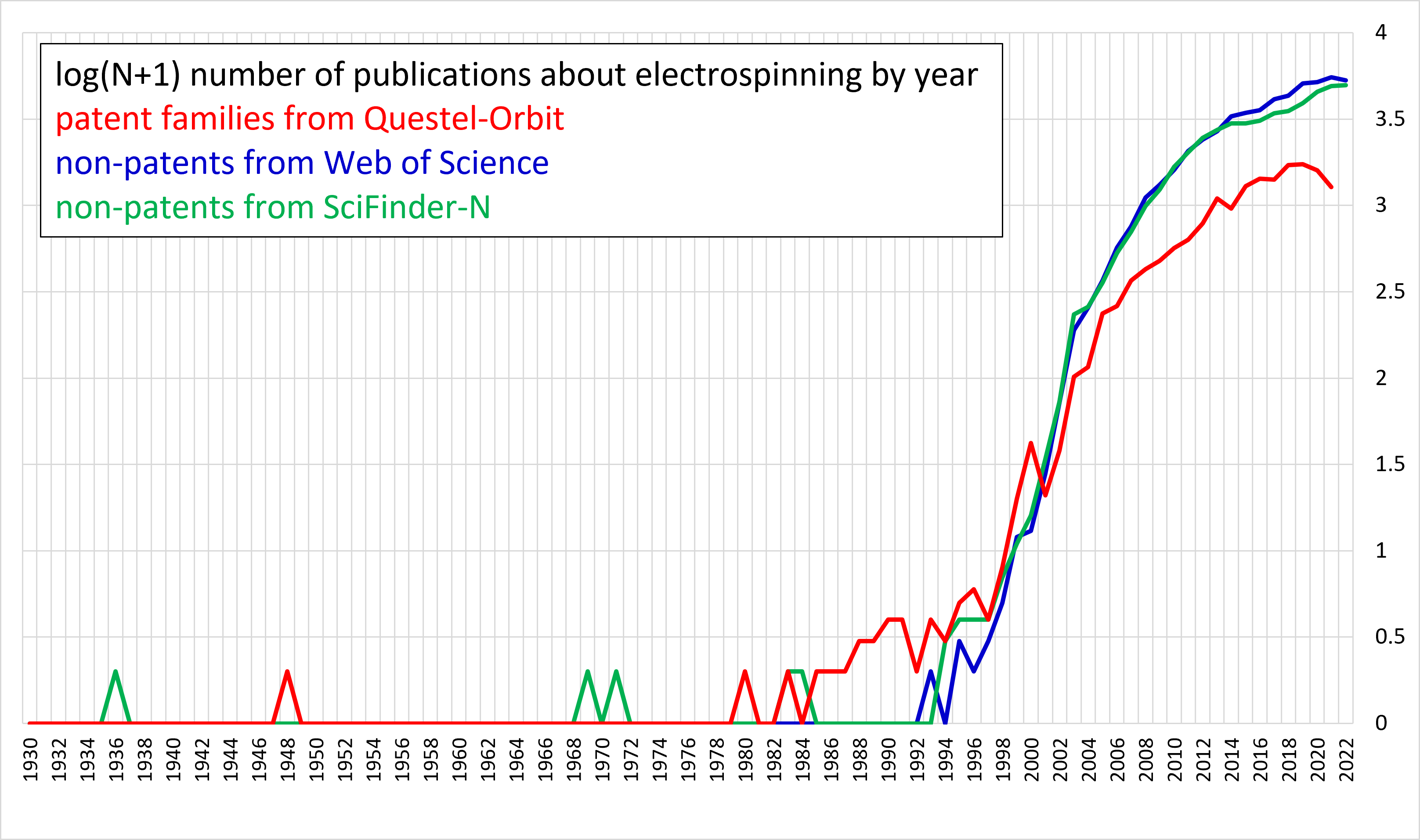
log(N+1) number of publications about electrospinning by year: patent families from Questel-Orbit, non-patents from Web of Science and from SciFinder-N

In the early 1990s several research groups (notably that of Reneker and Rutledge who popularised the name electrospinning for the process) demonstrated that many organic polymers could be electrospun into nanofibers. Between 1996 and 2003 the interest in electrospinning underwent an explosive growth, with the number of publications and patent applications approximately doubling every year.

Since 1995 there have been further theoretical developments of the driving mechanisms of the electrospinning process. Reznik et al. described the shape of the Taylor cone and the subsequent ejection of a fluid jet. Hohman et al. investigated the relative growth rates of the numerous proposed instabilities in an electrically forced jet once in flight and endeavors to describe the most important instability to the electrospinning process, the bending (whipping) instability.

== Uses ==
The size of an electrospun fiber can be in the nano scale and the fibers may possess nano scale surface texture, leading to different modes of interaction with other materials compared with macroscale materials. In addition to this, the ultra-fine fibers produced by electrospinning are expected to have two main properties, a very high surface to volume ratio, and a relatively defect free structure at the molecular level. This first property makes electrospun material suitable for activities requiring a high degree of physical contact, such as providing sites for chemical reactions, or the capture of small sized particulate material by physical entanglement – filtration. The second property should allow electrospun fibers to approach the theoretical maximum strength of the spun material, opening up the possibility of making high mechanical performance composite materials.

=== Filtration and adsorption ===
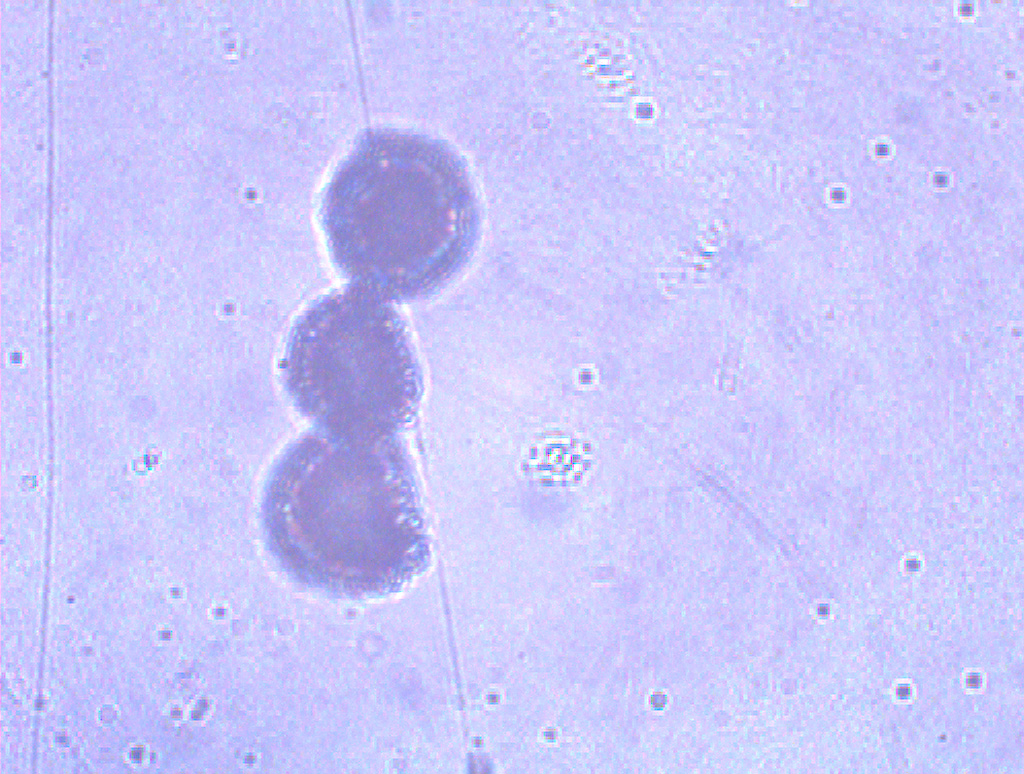
Lycopodium club moss spores (diameter about 60 micrometers) captured on an electrospun polyvinyl alcohol fiber

The use of nanofiber webs as a filtering medium is well established. Due to the small size of the fibers London-Van Der Waals forces are an important method of adhesion between the fibers and the captured materials. Polymeric nanofibers have been used in air filtration applications for more than seven decades. Because of poor bulk mechanical properties of thin nanowebs, they are laid over a filtration medium substrate. The small fiber diameters cause slip flows at fiber surfaces, causing an increase in the interception and inertial impaction efficiencies of these composite filter media. The enhanced filtration efficiency at the same pressure drop is possible with fibers having diameters less than 0.5 micrometer. Since the essential properties of protective clothing are high moisture vapor transport, increased fabric breath-ability, and enhanced toxic chemical resistance, electrospun nanofiber membranes are good candidates for these applications.

Given the high surface-to-volume ratio of electrospun nanofibers, they can also be used as relatively efficient adsorbents compared to micron-sized fibers. One way to achieve this is by mixing the electrospinning solution with suitable additives or by using active polymers. For example, iron oxide nanoparticles, a good arsenic adsorbent, can be trapped within poly(vinyl alcohol) electrospun nanofibers for water remmediation.

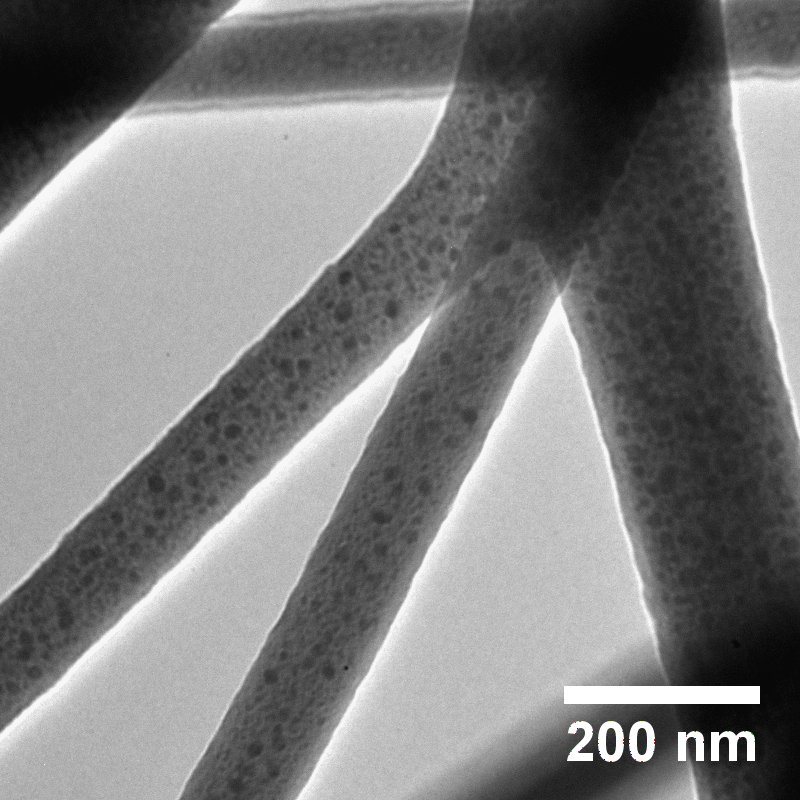
Transmission electron micrograph of electrospun poly(vinyl alcohol) nanofibers loaded with iron oxide nanoparticles. These nanoparticles can be used for the adsorption of water contaminants.

=== Textile manufacturing ===
The majority of early patents for electrospinning were for textile applications, however little woven fabric was actually produced, perhaps due to difficulties in handling the barely visible fibers. However, electrospinning has the potential to produce seamless non-woven garments by integrating advanced manufacturing with fiber electrospinning. This would introduce multi-functionality (flame, chemical, environmental protection) by blending fibers into electrospinlaced (using electrospinning to combine different fibers and coatings to form three-dimensional shapes, such as clothing) layers in combination with polymer coatings.

=== Medical ===
Electrospinning can also be used for medical purposes. The electrospun scaffolds made for tissue engineering applications can be penetrated with cells to treat or replace biological targets. Nanofibrous wound dressings have excellent capability to isolate the wound from microbial infections. Other medical textile materials such as sutures are also attainable via electrospinning. Through the addition of a drug substance into the electrospinning solution or melt diverse fibrous drug delivery systems (e.g., implants, transdermal patches, oral forms) can be prepared. Electropsun propolis nanofibrous membrane showed an antiviral effect against the SARS-CoV-2 virus, and an antibacterial effect against Staphylococcus aureus and Salmonella enterica bacteria. Interestingly, electrospinning allows to fabricate nanofibers with advanced architecture that can be used to promote the delivery of multiple drugs at the same time and with different kinetics. Composite printing was explored by incorporating lignosulfonate into cellulose acetate, creating antibacterial properties. Electrospun nanofibers have attracted considerable interest in wound healing because their porous structure and high surface-area-to-volume ratio can mimic the extracellular matrix, facilitating cell attachment, proliferation, and tissue regeneration.

=== Cosmetic ===
Electrospun nanomaterials have been employed to control their delivery so they can work within skin to improve its appearance. Electrospinning is an alternative to traditional nanoemulsions and nanoliposomes.

=== Pharmaceutical manufacturing ===
The continuous manner and the effective drying effect enable the integration of electrospinning into continuous pharmaceutical manufacturing systems. The synthesized liquid drug can be quickly turned into an electrospun solid product processable for tableting and other dosage forms.

=== Composites ===
Ultra-fine electrospun fibers show clear potential for the manufacture of long fiber composite materials.

Application is limited by difficulties in making sufficient quantities of fiber to make substantial large scale articles in a reasonable time scale. For this reason medical applications requiring relatively small amounts of fiber are a popular area of application for electrospun fiber reinforced materials.

Electrospinning is being investigated as a source of cost-effective, easy to manufacture wound dressings, medical implants, and scaffolds for the production of artificial human tissues. These scaffolds fulfill a similar purpose as the extracellular matrix in natural tissue. Biodegradable polymers, such as polycaprolactone and polysaccharides, are typically used for this purpose. These fibers may then be coated with collagen to promote cell attachment, although collagen has successfully been spun directly into membranes.

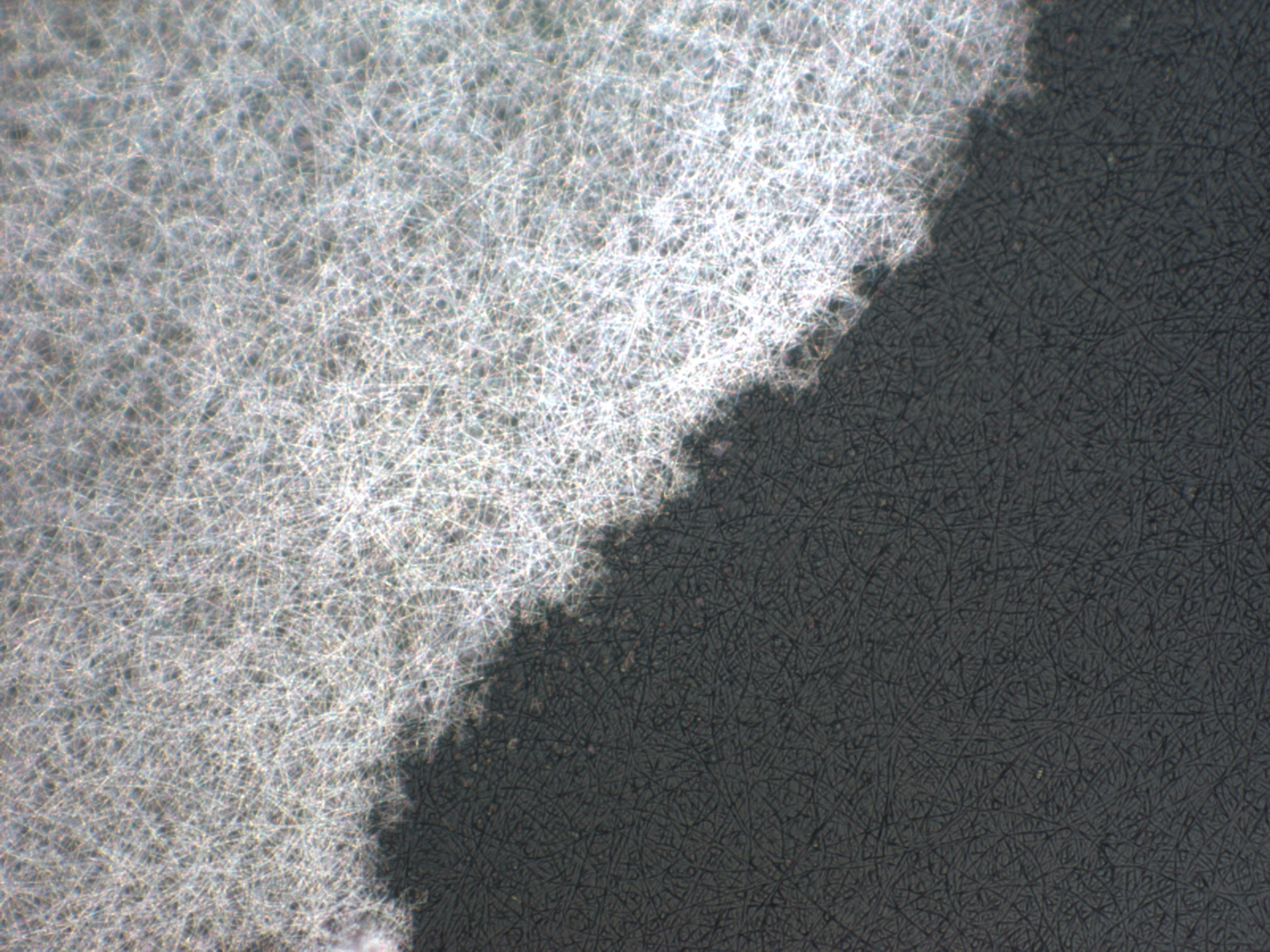
Optical image of epoxy resin impregnating an electrospun polyvinyl alcohol reinforcing fiber mat

SEM image of the fracture surface of a polyvinyl alcohol long fiber – epoxy matrix composite – the section thickness is about 12 micrometers

Transmission electron micrograph of electrospun poly(vinyl alcohol) nanofibers loaded with iron oxide nanoparticles. These nanoparticles can be used for the adsorption of water contaminants.

=== Catalysts ===
Electrospun fibers may have potential as a surface for enzymes to be immobilized on. These enzymes could be used to break down toxic chemicals in the environment, among other things.

== Mass production ==
Thus far, at least eight countries in the world have companies which provide industrial-level and laboratory-scale electrospinning machines: three companies each in Italy and Czech Republic, two each in Iran, Japan, and Spain, and one each in the Netherlands, New Zealand, and Turkey.
