= Electrospray ionization =

Technique used in mass spectroscopy

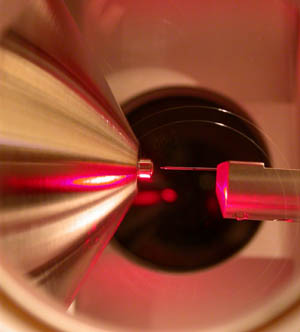
Electrospray (nanoSpray) ionization source

Electrospray ionization (ESI) is a technique used in mass spectrometry to produce ions using an electrospray in which a high voltage is applied to a liquid to create an aerosol. It is especially useful in producing ions from macromolecules because it overcomes the propensity of these molecules to fragment when ionized. ESI is different from other ionization processes (e.g. matrix-assisted laser desorption/ionization (MALDI)) since it may produce multiple-charged ions, effectively extending the mass range of the analyser to accommodate the kDa-MDa range observed in proteins and their associated polypeptide fragments.

Mass spectrometry using ESI is called electrospray ionization mass spectrometry (ESI-MS) or, less commonly, electrospray mass spectrometry (ES-MS). ESI is a so-called 'soft ionization' technique, since there is very little fragmentation. This can be advantageous in the sense that the molecular ion (or more accurately a pseudo molecular ion) is almost always observed, however very little structural information can be gained from the simple mass spectrum obtained. This disadvantage can be overcome by coupling ESI with tandem mass spectrometry (ESI-MS/MS). Another important advantage of ESI is that solution-phase information can be retained into the gas-phase.

The electrospray ionization technique was first reported by Masamichi Yamashita and John Fenn in 1984, and independently by Lidia Gall and co-workers in Soviet Union, also in 1984. Gall's work was not recognised or translated in the western scientific literature until a translation was published in 2008. The development of electrospray ionization for the analysis of biological macromolecules was rewarded with the attribution of the Nobel Prize in Chemistry to John Bennett Fenn and Koichi Tanaka in 2002. One of the original instruments used by Fenn is on display at the Science History Institute in Philadelphia, Pennsylvania.

== History ==
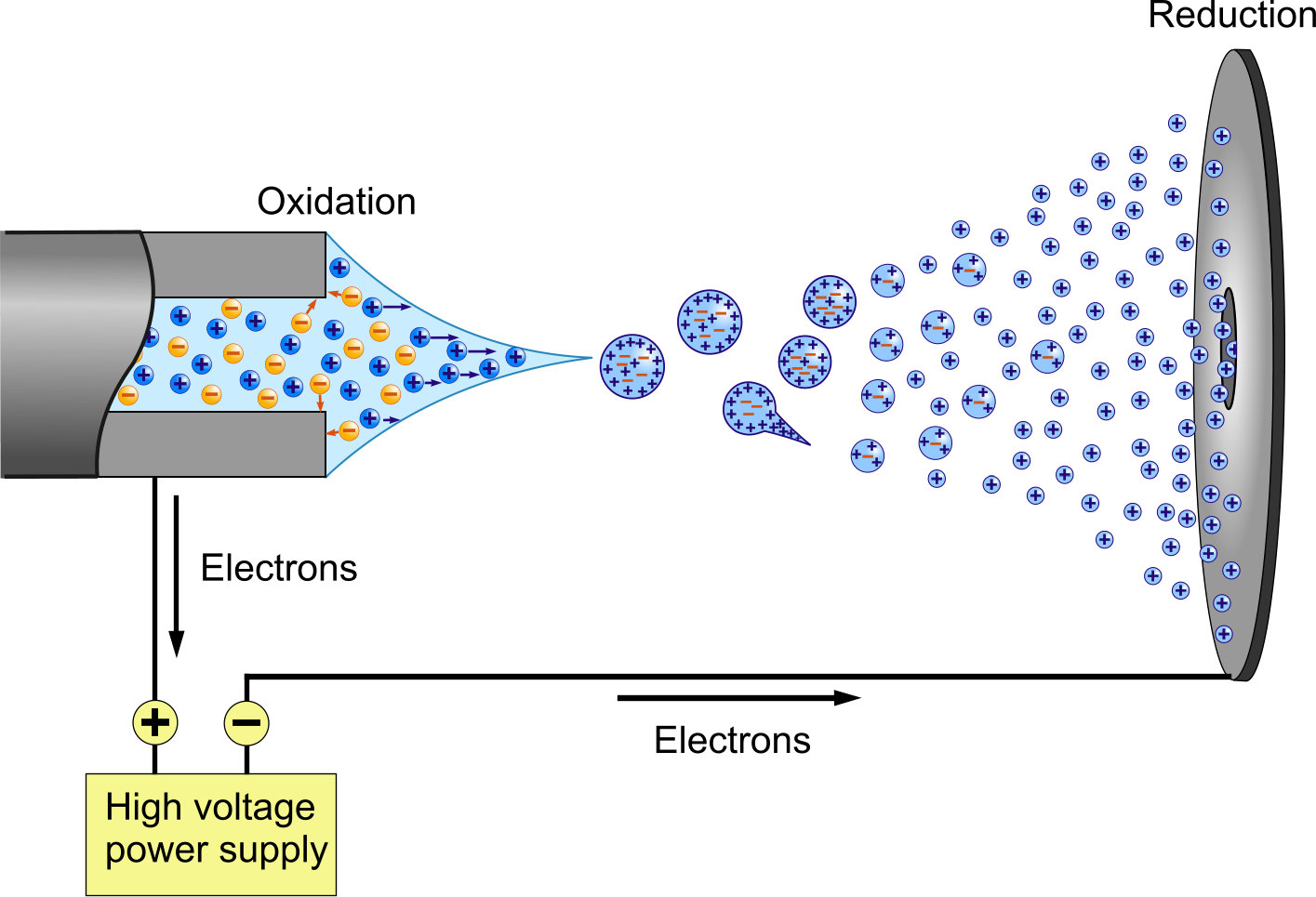
Diagram of electrospray ionization in positive mode: under high voltage, the Taylor cone emits a jet of liquid drops. The solvent from the droplets progressively evaporates, leaving them more and more charged. When the charge exceeds the Rayleigh limit the droplet explosively dissociates, leaving a stream of charged (positive) ions

In 1882, Lord Rayleigh theoretically estimated the maximum amount of charge a liquid droplet could carry before throwing out fine jets of liquid. This is now known as the Rayleigh limit.

In 1914, John Zeleny published work on the behaviour of fluid droplets at the end of glass capillaries and presented evidence for different electrospray modes. Wilson and Taylor and Nolan investigated electrospray in the 1920s and Macky in 1931. The electrospray cone (now known as the Taylor cone) was described by Sir Geoffrey Ingram Taylor.

The first use of electrospray ionization with mass spectrometry was reported by Malcolm Dole in 1968. John Bennett Fenn was awarded the 2002 Nobel Prize in Chemistry for the development of electrospray ionization mass spectrometry in the late 1980s.

== Ionization mechanism ==
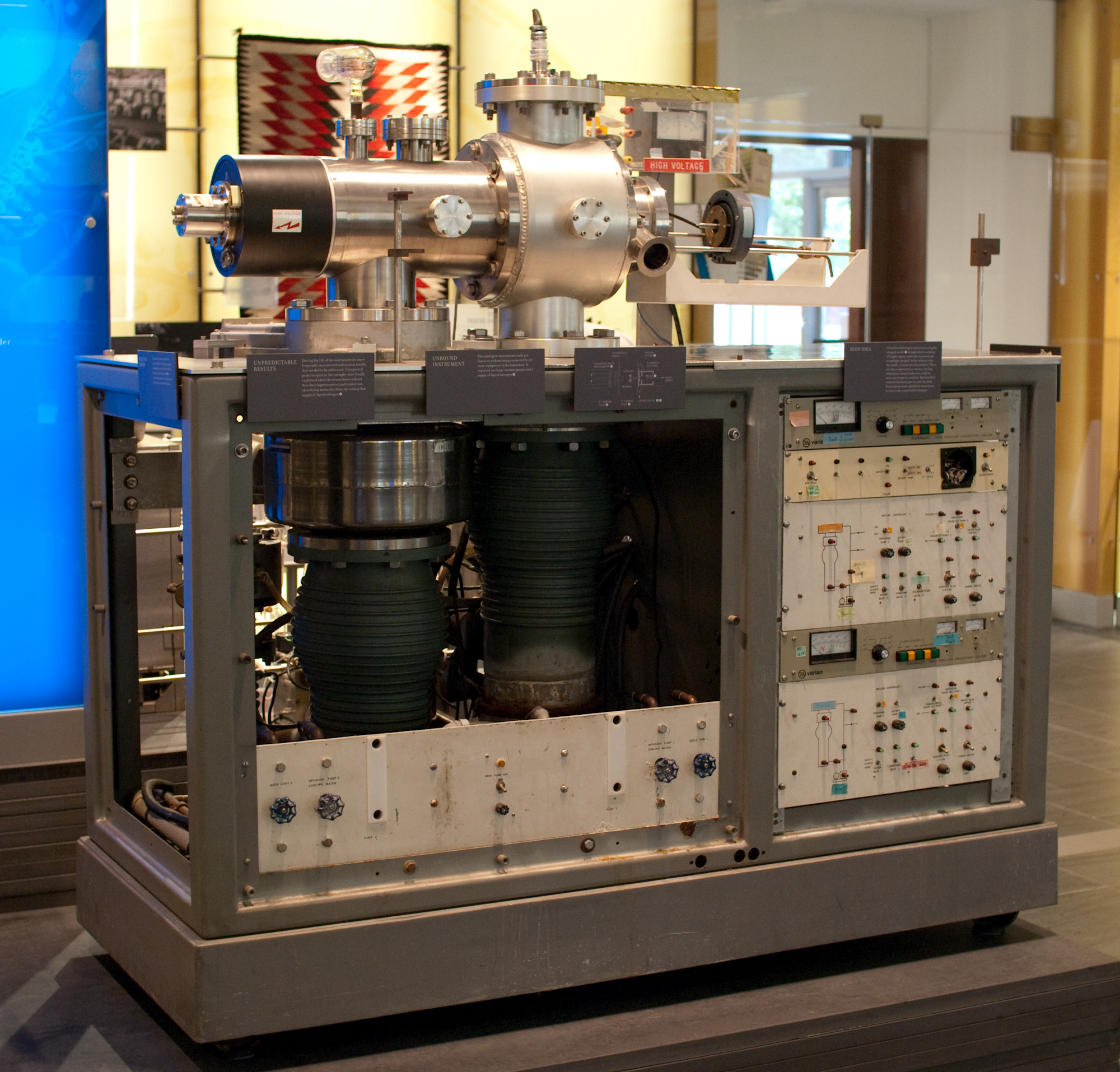
Fenn's first electrospray ionization source coupled to a single quadrupole mass spectrometer

The liquid containing the analytes of interest (typically 10^{−6} - 10^{−4} M needed) is dispersed by electrospray, into a fine aerosol. Because the ion formation involves extensive solvent evaporation (also termed desolvation), the typical solvents for electrospray ionization are prepared by mixing water with volatile organic compounds (e.g. methanol, acetonitrile). To decrease the initial droplet size, compounds that increase the conductivity (e.g. acetic acid) are customarily added to the solution. These species also act to provide a source of protons to facilitate the ionization process. Large-flow electrosprays can benefit from nebulization with a heated inert gas such as nitrogen or carbon dioxide in addition to the high temperature of the ESI source. The aerosol is sampled into the first vacuum stage of a mass spectrometer through a capillary carrying a potential difference of approximately 3000 V, which can be heated to aid further solvent evaporation from the charged droplets. The solvent evaporates from a charged droplet until it becomes unstable upon reaching its Rayleigh limit. At this point, the droplet deforms as the electrostatic repulsion of like charges, in an ever-decreasing droplet size, becomes more powerful than the surface tension holding the droplet together. At this point the droplet undergoes Coulomb fission, whereby the original droplet 'explodes' creating many smaller, more stable droplets. The new droplets undergo desolvation and subsequently further Coulomb fissions. During the fission, the droplet loses a small percentage of its mass (1.0–2.3%) along with a relatively large percentage of its charge (10–18%).

There are two major theories that explain the final production of gas-phase ions: the ion evaporation model (IEM) and the charge residue model (CRM). The IEM suggests that as the droplet reaches a certain radius the field strength at the surface of the droplet becomes large enough to assist the field desorption of solvated ions. The CRM suggests that electrospray droplets undergo evaporation and fission cycles, eventually leading progeny droplets that contain on average one analyte ion or less. The gas-phase ions form after the remaining solvent molecules evaporate, leaving the analyte with the charges that the droplet carried.

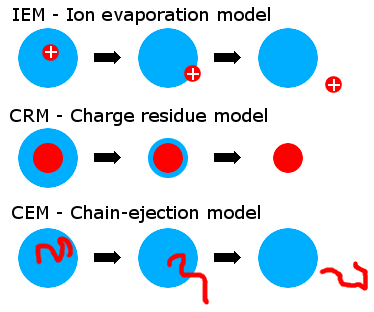
IEM, CRM and CEM schematic.

A large body of evidence shows either directly or indirectly that small ions (from small molecules) are liberated into the gas phase through the ion evaporation mechanism, while larger ions (from folded proteins for instance) form by charged residue mechanism.

A third model invoking combined charged residue-field emission has been proposed. Another model called chain ejection model (CEM) is proposed for disordered polymers (unfolded proteins).

The ions observed by mass spectrometry may be quasimolecular ions created by the addition of a hydrogen cation and denoted [M + H]^{+}, or of another cation such as sodium ion, [M + Na]^{+}, or the removal of a hydrogen nucleus, [M − H]^{−}. Multiply charged ions such as [M + nH]^{n+} are often observed. For large macromolecules, there can be many charge states, resulting in a characteristic charge state envelope. All these are even-electron ion species: electrons (alone) are not added or removed, unlike in some other ionization sources. The analytes are sometimes involved in electrochemical processes, leading to shifts of the corresponding peaks in the mass spectrum. This effect is demonstrated in the direct ionization of noble metals such as copper, silver and gold using electrospray.

The efficiency of generating the gas phase ions for small molecules in ESI varies depending on the compound structure, the solvent used and instrumental parameters. The differences in ionization efficiency vary more than 1 million times.

== Variants ==
The electrosprays operated at low flow rates generate much smaller initial droplets, which ensure improved ionization efficiency. In 1993 Gale and Richard D. Smith reported significant sensitivity increases could be achieved using lower flow rates, and down to 200 nL/min. In 1994, two research groups coined the name micro-electrospray (microspray) for electrosprays working at low flow rates. Emmett and Caprioli demonstrated improved performance for HPLC-MS analyses when the electrospray was operated at 300–800 nL/min. Wilm and Mann demonstrated that a capillary flow of ~ 25 nL/min can sustain an electrospray at the tip of emitters fabricated by pulling glass capillaries to a few micrometers. The latter was renamed nano-electrospray (nanospray) in 1996. Currently the name nanospray is also in use for electrosprays fed by pumps at low flow rates, not only for self-fed electrosprays. Although there may not be a well-defined flow rate range for electrospray, microspray, and nano-electrospray, studied "changes in analyte partition during droplet fission prior to ion release". In this paper, they compare results obtained by three other groups. and then measure the signal intensity ratio [Ba^{2+} + Ba^{+}]/[BaBr^{+}] at different flow rates.

Cold spray ionization is a form of electrospray in which the solution containing the sample is forced through a small cold capillary (10–80 °C) into an electric field to create a fine mist of cold charged droplets. Applications of this method include the analysis of fragile molecules and guest-host interactions that cannot be studied using regular electrospray ionization.

Electrospray ionization has also been achieved at pressures as low as 25 torr and termed subambient pressure ionization with nanoelectrospray (SPIN) based upon a two-stage ion funnel interface developed by Richard D. Smith and coworkers. The SPIN implementation provided increased sensitivity due to the use of ion funnels that helped confine and transfer ions to the lower pressure region of the mass spectrometer. The nanoelectrospray emitter is made out of a fine capillary with a small aperture of about 1–3 micrometer. For sufficient conductivity this capillary is usually sputter-coated with conductive material, e.g. gold. Nanoelectrospray ionization consumes only a few microliters of a sample and forms smaller droplets. Operation at low pressure was particularly effective for low flow rates where the smaller electrospray droplet size allowed effective desolvation and ion formation to be achieved. As a result, the researchers were later able to demonstrate achieving an excess of 50% overall ionization utilization efficiency for transfer of ions from the liquid phase, into the gas phase as ions, and through the dual ion funnel interface to the mass spectrometer.

=== Ambient ionization ===
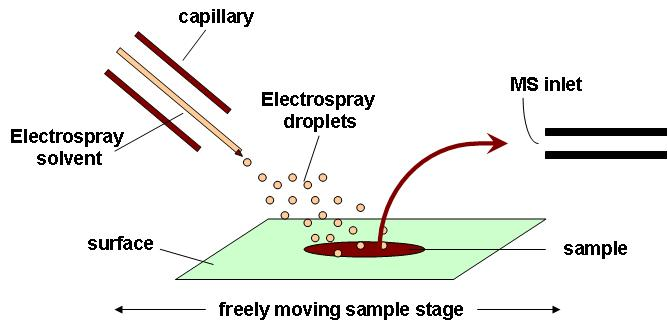
Diagram of a DESI ambient ionization source

In ambient ionization, the formation of ions occurs outside the mass spectrometer without sample preparation. Electrospray is used for ion formation in a number of ambient ion sources.

Desorption electrospray ionization (DESI) is an ambient ionization technique in which a solvent electrospray is directed at a sample. The electrospray is attracted to the surface by applying a voltage to the sample. Sample compounds are extracted into the solvent which is again aerosolized as highly charged droplets that evaporate to form highly charged ions. After ionization, the ions enter the atmospheric pressure interface of the mass spectrometer. DESI allows for ambient ionization of samples at atmospheric pressure, with little sample preparation.

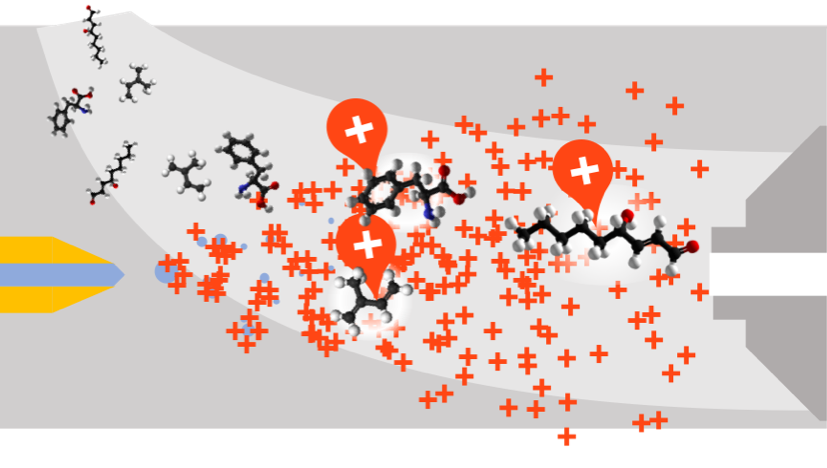
Diagram of a SESI ambient ionization source

Extractive electrospray ionization is a spray-type, ambient ionization method that uses two merged sprays, one of which is generated by electrospray.

Laser-based electrospray-based ambient ionization is a two-step process in which a pulsed laser is used to desorb or ablate material from a sample and the plume of material interacts with an electrospray to create ions. For ambient ionization, the sample material is deposited on a target near the electrospray. The laser desorbs or ablates material from the sample which is ejected from the surface and into the electrospray which produces highly charged ions. Examples are electrospray laser desorption ionization, matrix-assisted laser desorption electrospray ionization, and laser ablation electrospray ionization.

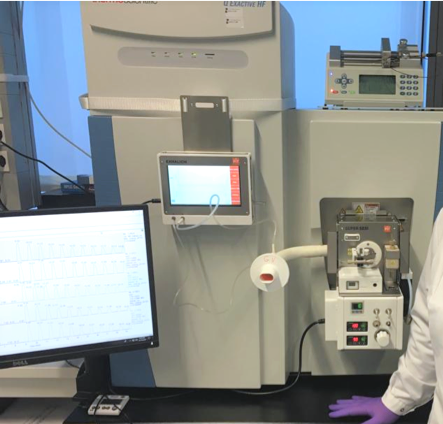
SESI-MS SUPER SESI coupled with Thermo Fisher Scientific-Orbitrap

Electrostatic spray ionization (ESTASI) involved the analysis of samples located on a flat or porous surface, or inside a microchannel. A droplet containing analytes is deposited on a sample area, to which a pulsed high voltage to is applied. When the electrostatic pressure is larger than the surface tension, droplets and ions are sprayed.

Secondary electrospray ionization (SESI) is an spray type, ambient ionization method where charging ions are produced by means of an electrospray. These ions then charge vapor molecules in the gas phase when colliding with them.

In paper spray ionization, the sample is applied to a piece of paper, solvent is added, and a high voltage is applied to the paper, creating ions.

== Applications ==
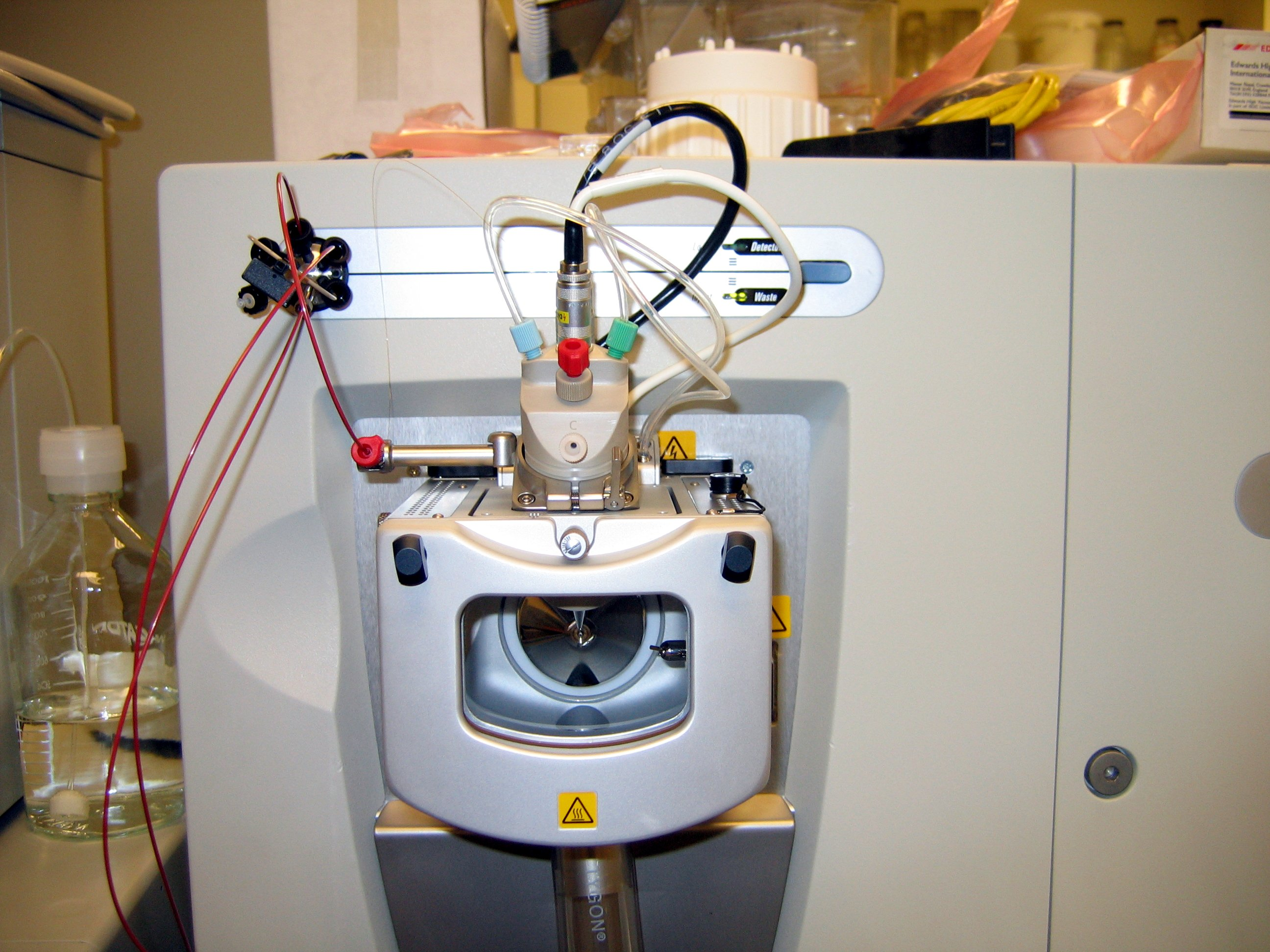
The outside of the electrospray interface on an LTQ mass spectrometer.

Electrospray is used to study protein folding.

=== Liquid chromatography–mass spectrometry ===
Electrospray ionization is the ion source of choice to couple liquid chromatography with mass spectrometry (LC-MS). The analysis can be performed online, by feeding the liquid eluting from the LC column directly to an electrospray, or offline, by collecting fractions to be later analyzed in a classical nanoelectrospray-mass spectrometry setup. Among the numerous operating parameters in ESI-MS, for proteins, the electrospray voltage has been identified as an important parameter to consider in ESI LC/MS gradient elution. The effect of various solvent compositions (such as TFA or ammonium acetate, or supercharging reagents, or derivitizing groups) or spraying conditions on electrospray-LCMS spectra and/or nanoESI-MS spectra. have been studied.

=== Capillary electrophoresis-mass spectrometry (CE-MS) ===
Capillary electrophoresis-mass spectrometry was enabled by an ESI interface that was developed and patented by Richard D. Smith and coworkers at Pacific Northwest National Laboratory, and shown to have broad utility for the analysis of very small biological and chemical compound mixtures, and even extending to a single biological cell.

=== Noncovalent gas phase interactions ===
Electrospray ionization is also utilized in studying noncovalent gas phase interactions. The electrospray process is thought to be capable of transferring liquid-phase noncovalent complexes into the gas phase without disrupting the noncovalent interaction. Problems such as non specific interactions have been identified when studying ligand substrate complexes by ESI-MS or nanoESI-MS. An interesting example of this is studying the interactions between enzymes and drugs which are inhibitors of the enzyme. Competition studies between STAT6 and inhibitors have used ESI as a way to screen for potential new drug candidates.

Electrospray ionization can even be used for studying protein complexes >1 MDa.

== See also ==
- Laser ablation electrospray ionization
- Probe electrospray ionization
- Sonic spray ionization
