= Charles Zeleny =

American zoologist

- Born: 17 September 1878; Hutchinson, Minnesota, United States
- Died: 21 December 1939 (aged 61); Urbana, Illinois, United States
- Scientific career
- Fields: Zoology
- Workplaces: University of Illinois at Urbana-Champaign
- Doctoral students: Effa Muhse
- Other notable students: Marion Durbin Ellis

Charles H. Zeleny (17 September 1878 – 21 December 1939) was an American zoologist of Czech descent. He was a professor at the University of Illinois. He made important contributions to experimental zoology, especially embryology, regeneration, and genetics.

Zeleny was born in Hutchinson, Minnesota, the son of Czech immigrants from Křídla. He was the younger brother of John Zeleny. He died in Urbana, Illinois. He co-supervised Effa Muhse the first female to graduate with a PhD from Indiana University. Marion Durbin Ellis was also one of his students at Indiana.
