= Paulo Lozano =

Aerospace Engineer

Paulo Lozano is an aerospace engineer focusing in space propulsion, electrospray thrusters, micro- and nanofabrication, space mission design, small satellite technology development, ion beams, and additive manufacturing. He is currently the M. Aleman-Velasco Professor of Aeronautics and Astronautics, as well as Director of the Space Propulsion Laboratory at the Massachusetts Institute of Technology.
