= Flow focusing =

Technology in fluid dynamics

Flow focusing in fluid dynamics is a technology whose aim is the production of drops or bubbles by straightforward hydrodynamic means. The output is a dispersed liquid or gas, frequently in the form of a fine aerosol or an emulsion. No other driving force is required, apart from traditional pumping, a key difference with other comparable technologies, such as electrospray (where an electric field is needed). Both flow focusing and electrospray working in their most extensively used regime produce high quality sprays composed by homogeneous and well-controlled-size droplets. Flow focusing was invented by Prof. Alfonso M. Gañan-Calvo (who now teaches at ETSI in the University of Seville) in 1994, patented in 1996, and published for the first time in 1998.

== Mechanism ==
The basic principle consists of a continuous phase fluid (focusing or sheath fluid) flanking or surrounding the dispersed phase (focused or core fluid), so as to give rise to droplet or bubble break-off in the vicinity of an orifice through which both fluids are extruded. The principle may be extended to two or more coaxial fluids; gases and liquids may be combined; and, depending on the geometry of the feed tube and orifices, the flow pattern may be cylindrical or planar. Both cylindrical and planar flow focusing have led to a variety of developments (see also the works of Peter Walzal).

A flow focusing device consists of a pressure chamber pressurized with a continuous focusing fluid supply. Inside, one or more focused fluids are injected through a capillary feed tube whose extremity opens up in front of a small orifice, linking the pressure chamber with the exterior ambient. The focusing fluid stream moulds the fluid meniscus into a cusp giving rise to a steady micro or nano-jet exiting the chamber through the orifice; the jet size is much smaller than the exit orifice, thus precluding any contact (which may lead to unwanted deposition or reaction). Capillary instability breaks up the steady jet into homogeneous droplets or bubbles.

The feed tube may be composed of two or more concentric needles and different immiscible liquids or gases to be injected, leading to compound drops. On being suitably cured, such drops may lead to multilayer microcapsules with multiple shells of controllable thickness. Flow focusing ensures an extremely fast as well as controlled production of up to millions of droplets per second as the jet breaks up.

The role of the tangential viscous stress is essential in establishing a steady meniscus shape in flow focusing, as illustrated in the case of a simple liquid jet surrounded by a gas. In the absence of a sufficiently strong tangential stress, a round-apex meniscus is obtained. Both the inner liquid and the external gas flows would exhibit stagnation regions around the round apex. The surface tension stress σ/D would be simply balanced by an appropriate pressure jump across the interface. If one slowly pushes a liquid flow rate Q, the system would spit intermittently the excess of liquid to recover the round-apex equilibrium shape. However, when the tangential stress is sufficiently vigorous compared to σ /D, the surface can be deformed into a steady tapering shape, which allows the continuous and smooth acceleration of the liquid under the combined actions of the pressure drop ΔP and the tangential viscous stress τs on the liquid surface.

== Applications ==
Flow Focusing is currently the most common technological option for the introduction of biological samples (viruses, protein microcrystals, cell organelles, etc.) into all X-Ray Free-Electron Lasers (XFEL) worldwide for the determination of complex molecular structures using the Serial Femtosecond Crystallography (SFX) procedure. It is also known as Gas Dynamic Virtual Nozzle (GDVN) since its adoption in the development of SFX. Flow focusing may be also applied in the food, medicine, pharmaceutical, cosmetic, photographic and environmental industry, among other potential uses. The production of compound particles and microcapsules is an important field: drug encapsulation, dye-labeled particles and multiple-core particles can be cited. Other applications include flow cytometry and microfluidic circuits. Contrast agent such as droplets and Microbubbles can be produced in flow focusing microfluidics device.
