= Paper spray ionization =

Technique used in mass spectrometry

Paper spray ionization is a technique used in mass spectrometry to produce ions from a sample to be analyzed. It is a variant of electrospray ionization. The sample (for instance a few microlitres of blood or urine) is applied to a piece of paper and solvent is added. Then a high voltage is applied, which creates the ions to be analyzed with a mass spectrometer. The method, first described in 2010, is relatively easy to use and can detect and measure the presence of various substances in the sample. This technique shows great potential for point-of-care clinical applications, in that important tests may be run and results obtained within a reasonable amount of time in proximity to the patient in a single visit. In 2017 it was reported that a test based on paper spray ionization mass spectrometry can detect cocaine use from a subject's fingerprint. It was also used to detect pesticides from the surfaces of fruits.

More recently, an advanced form of Paper Spray, termed Paper Arrow, was developed. This universal approach seamlessly hyphenates Paper Chromatography and Mass Spectrometry, facilitated by on-paper ionization without requiring visual indicators. The entire process of Paper Arrow was shown to be simple and fast, requiring only 2 μL of raw biological sample. Its analytical performance is in accordance with stringent clinical guidelines, and it demonstrated superior figures of merit compared to LC-MS. Paper Arrow is one of the few ambient ionization sources that has been clinically validated. In a study with 17 volunteers, blood and saliva samples were collected before and at 15, 30, 60 and 240 min after ingesting 1 g of paracetamol. Detection from stimulated saliva and plasma with PA-MS provided a reliable result that can aid in making timely treatment decisions. Moreover, participants' views of blood and saliva sampling procedures were assessed qualitatively, showing a preference for non-invasive sampling.
