= Petryanov filter =

A Petryanov filter is a type of filtering cloth that is used for fine and super fine cleaning of air and other gases of fine aerosols. Gases contaminated with aerosols with a solid phase concentration of 0.5 mg/m^{3} can be cleaned by using these filters. These filters are commonly fabricated using electrospinning techniques, and were first developed in 1939 by Nathalie D. Rozenblum and Igor V. Petryanov-Sokolov.
