= Effa Muhse =

American biologist

Dr. Effa Muhse
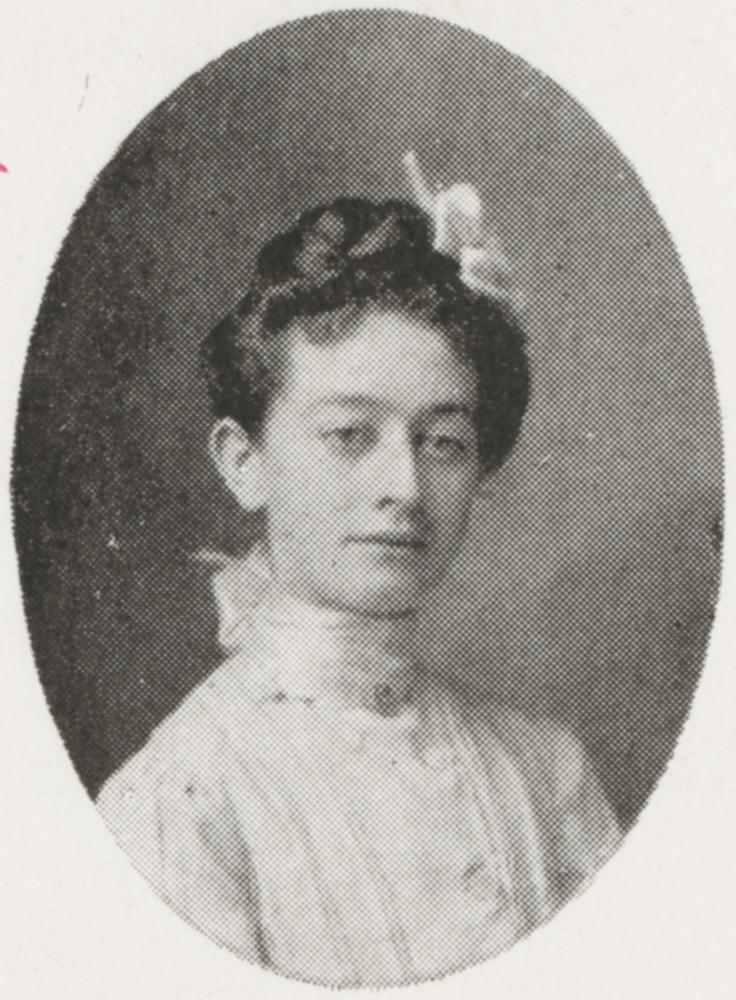
- Born: Effa Funk; June 19, 1877; Blachleyville, Ohio, US
- Died: February 7, 1968 (aged 90 years); Wooster, Ohio, US
- Resting place: Wooster Cemetery
- Other names: Ella, Effie
- Education: A.B. Indiana University Bloomington (1903) A.M. Indiana University Bloomington (1906) PhD Indiana University Bloomington (1908)
- Known for: 1st women to be granted PhD from Indiana University
- Spouse: Dr. Albert C. Muhse
- Scientific career
- Fields: Zoology, Civic Engagement
- Workplaces: National Park Seminary Chevy Chase School and Junior College (1927-1948)
- Thesis: The Cutaneous Glands of the Common Toad (1908)
- Doctoral advisor: Carl Eigenmann, Charles Zeleny

Dr. Effa Funk Muhse (19 June 1877 - 7 February 1968) was an American biologist. She was the first woman to obtain a PhD from Indiana University. While at Indiana, she studied glands in toads. After earning her degree, she went on to promote the National Woman's Party in Pennsylvania, Idaho, and Chicago. Later she became a biology teacher at Chevy Chase Junior College which later named a science building after her.

== Early life and education ==
She was born to Eliza Bair and Laban Funk in Blachleyville, Ohio in June 1877. They moved to Hebron, Indiana. While there, she attended Hebron High School (Indiana) in 1894. She briefly attended Northern Indiana Normal School until she quit to teach. She started college at Indiana University Bloomington in 1900. While at Indiana University, she was a member of the Graduate Club and Phi Beta Kappa. In 1903 she completed her A.B. She continued her studies at Indiana University Bloomington by completing her Master's degree in 1906. Initially she pursued her PhD at Cornell University. However, she transferred back to Indiana University Bloomington and completed her PhD in Zoology in 1908 under the instruction of Carl Eigenmann and Charles Zeleny. This resulted in her becoming the first women to get a PhD from the Indiana University.

== Career ==
After Muhse finished her dissertation, she spent time lecturing on a range of topics including rural sanitation. Later she became a member of the National Woman's Party where she became a suffragette to increase women's voices in politics. She worked in Pennsylvania in 1915 and in Idaho in 1916. From 1921 to 1927 Muhse taught at a variety of institutions. One of those institutions was National Park Seminary where she taught home economics and domestic arts. From 1927 until her retirement in 1948, Muhse taught biology at Chevy Chase College and Seminary later called Chevy Chase Junior College. She was successful in increasing female attendance in her biology classes.

== Works ==
- The Eyes of the Blind Vertebrates of North America. VI. The Eyes of Typhlops Lumbricalis (Linnæus), a Blind Snake from Cuba (1903)
- The Cutaneous Glands of the Common Toad (1909)
- Heredity and the Problems in Eugenics: A Report of the Subcommittee on Eugenics

== Personal life ==
Muhse was the oldest of five siblings. She had three sisters and two brothers. She married Albert Charles Muhse in 1899. They co-authored a piece called "Unpolished Rice".

== Later life and legacy ==
Her funeral took place at Central Christian Church (Indianapolis, Indiana). After she retired from Chevy Chase School and Junior College, a building was named after her.

== Awards and achievements ==
- Member of the American Association for Advancement of Science
- Member of Phi Beta Kappa
- Member of Sigma Xi
- Member of the Eugenic Education Services Society of London
- Member of Biological Society of Washington
- Emeritus faculty of Chevy Chase School and Junior College (1948)
