= Electrostatic spray ionization =

Electrostatic spray ionization (ESTASI) is an ambient ionization method for mass spectrometry (MS) analysis of samples located on a flat or porous surface, or inside a microchannel. It was developed in 2011 by Professor Hubert H. Girault’s group at the École Polytechnique Fédérale de Lausanne (EPFL) in Switzerland. In a typical ESTASI process, a droplet of a protic solvent containing analytes is deposited on a sample area of interest which itself is mounted to an insulating substrate. Under this substrate and right below the droplet, an electrode is placed and connected with a pulsed high voltage (HV) to electrostatically charge the droplet during pulsing. When the electrostatic pressure is larger than the surface tension, droplets and ions are sprayed. ESTASI is a contactless process based on capacitive coupling. One advantage of ESTASI is that the electrode and sample droplet act contact-less avoiding thereby any oxidation or reduction of the sample compounds at the electrode surface, which often happens during standard electrospray ionization (ESI). ESTASI is a powerful new ambient ionization technique that has already found many applications in the detection of different analytes, such as organic molecules, peptides and proteins with molecule weights up to 70 kDa. Furthermore, it was used to couple MS with various separation techniques including capillary electrophoresis and gel isoelectric focusing, and it was successfully applied under atmospheric pressure to the direct analysis of samples with only a few preparation steps.

== Principle of operation ==
ESTASI is a contactless electrospray ionization (ESI) method, like dielectric barrier ESI and induced or inductive ESI. In ESTASI, an electrode is placed close to a sample only separated by an insulation layer. The sample is covered with a droplet of solution (nano-liters to micro-liters); and a square wave HV is applied between the electrode and the mass spectrometer inlet capillary. Sample ionization occurs and ions are collected for mass spectrometry analysis. The square wave HV can be generated by amplifying the square wave voltage of a function generator. Alternatively, it can be produced by an electric circuit comprising one direct current HV power source and two switches that connect the electrode either to the HV source or to the ground.

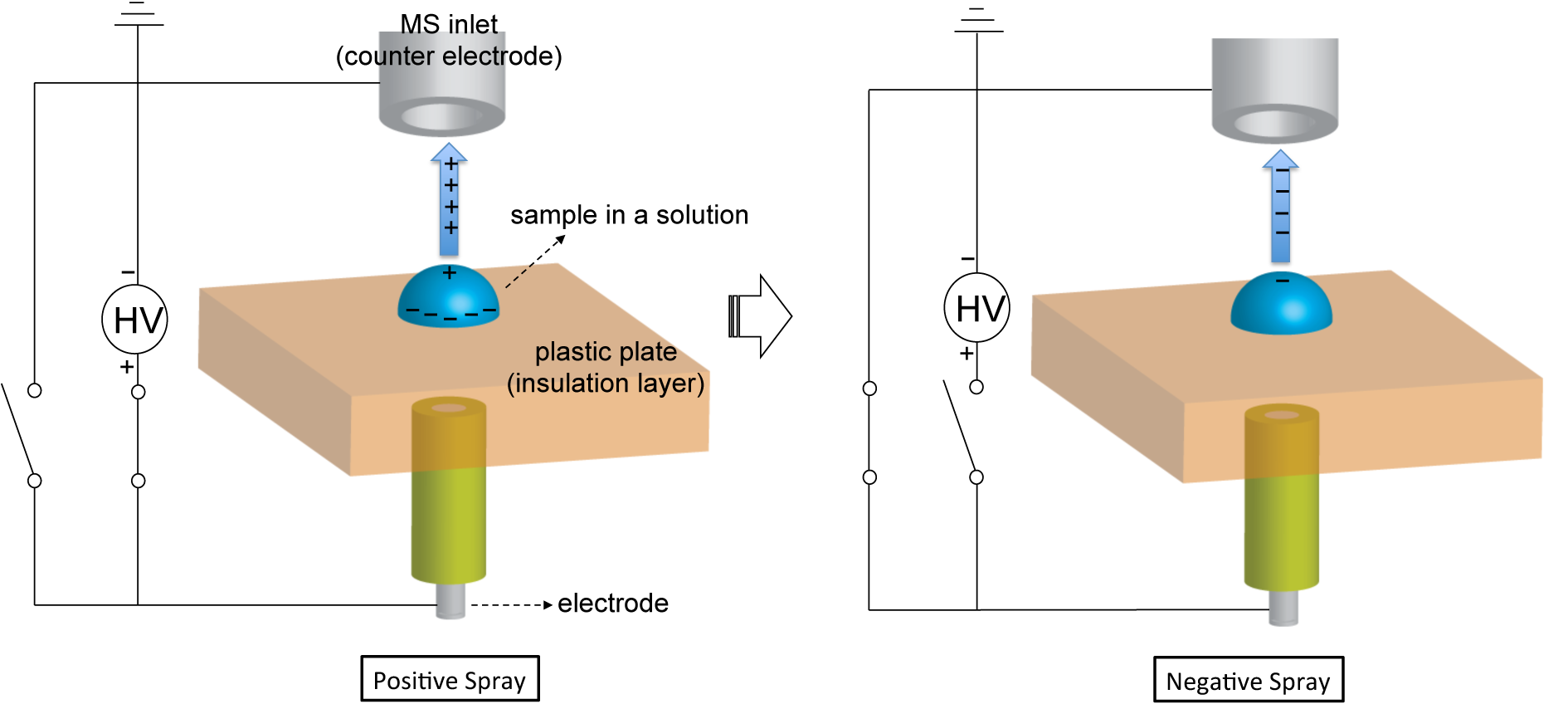
Schematic illustration of the working principle of ESTASI, HV: high voltage; MS inlet: the ion transfer capillary of a mass spectrometer.

When a positive HV is applied to the electrode with respect to the mass spectrometer, a spray of cations is generated out of the droplet containing the sample analytes because of the strong electric filed between the electrode and the mass spectrometer. Excess anions stay inside the droplet on the substrate and are subsequently sprayed when grounding the electrode. In this way, both cations and anions are subsequently measured by mass spectrometry in one experiment.

== Applications ==
ESTASI method can be applied to a wide range of geometries, e.g. samples in capillary, in a disposable pipette tip, in a polymer microchannel and in micro-, nano-liter droplets on a polymer or porous plate. With the last geometry, molecules on a surface can be directly ionized for MS detection by simply adding a droplet of buffer that can dissolve the target molecule. The current developed applications of ESTASI mainly include:

=== Interfacing capillary electrophoresis (CE) and MS analysis ===
Fractions of proteins or peptides from capillary electrophoresis were collected on an insulating plastic slide. Dry sample spots were formed by evaporating all solvents and then analyzed by ESTASI MS where droplets of acidic solution (1% acetic acid in water) were deposited on the dry sample spots to dissolve analytes from the sample. This is the first application and example of direct analysis of samples on a plat surface.

=== Interfacing gel electrophoresis and MS analysis ===
Samples inside porous matrices can also be analyzed by the ESTASI MS. During gel electrophoresis, peptides or proteins can be fractionated into different bands inside a gel. The gel is then placed on an insulating plastic plate for ESTASI MS analysis. The extraction of proteins/peptides from the gel for ESTASI MS analysis is realized by depositing a highly acidic solution droplet and by applying an HV. The protons migrate into the gel to protonate peptides/proteins inside the gel band and then the cations are extracted by the HV into the acidic droplet for ESTASI MS analysis.

=== Ambient ionization MS for direct analysis of samples with minimal preparation ===
ESTASI of many sample types can be carried without specific sample pre-treatments. One example is the fast analysis of perfume, where the perfume is directly sprayed on a smelling paper to form micro- nano-liter droplets, from which the ESTASI is generated.

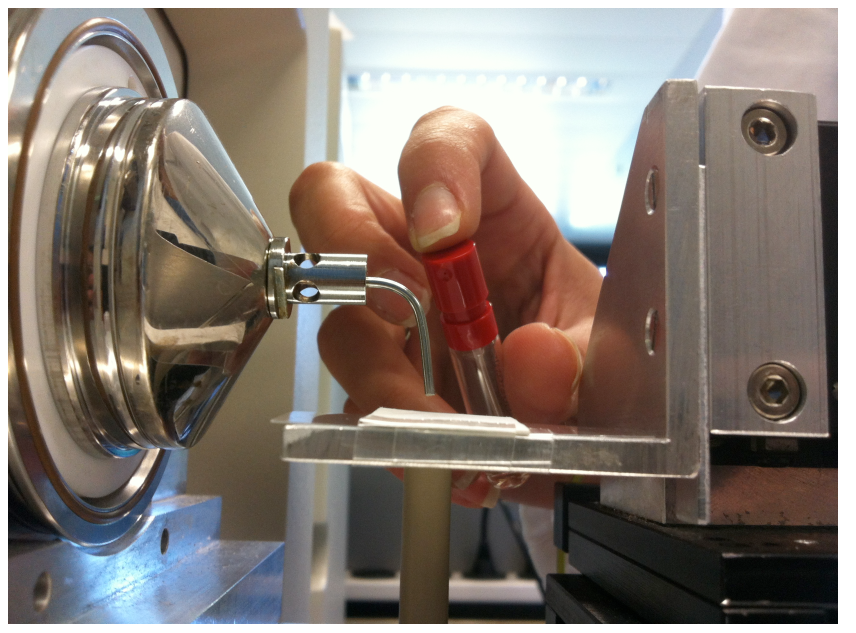
Parfume ESTASI
