= Roller electrospinning =

Method for producing nanofibres

Roller Electrospinning system a method for producing nanofibres was developed by Jirsak et al.. This method is known under the name Nanospider from Elmarco Company in Liberec. Roller electrospinning is the unique method which has been used in industry to produce nanofibers continuously. Nanospider consists of rotating roller to spin fibers directly from the polymer solution. This roller spinning electrode partially immersed in the tank with the polymer solution. A grounded collector electrode is placed at the top of the spinner . A nonwoven backing material moves along the collector electrode which makes the production of the nanofibre layer a continuous process. Many Taylor cones are simultaneously formed on the surface of the rotating spinning electrode, which makes the technology highly productive.

== Parameters ==
There are independent and dependent parameters for roller electrospinning.

=== Independent Parameters ===
Solution parameters: concentration of polymer solution, molecular weight of polymer, viscosity of polymer solution, surface tension and conductivity of polymer solution.
Process parameters: Applied voltage, velocity of rotating cylinder, collector type, distance from electrodes, velocity of take-up fabric, ambient parameters.

=== Dependent Parameters ===
Density of cones,
Life time of jet,
Spinning performance,
Spinning performance per cone,
Non-fibrous area,
Fiber diameter distribution.
