= Taylor cone =

Liquid shape formed in electrospraying

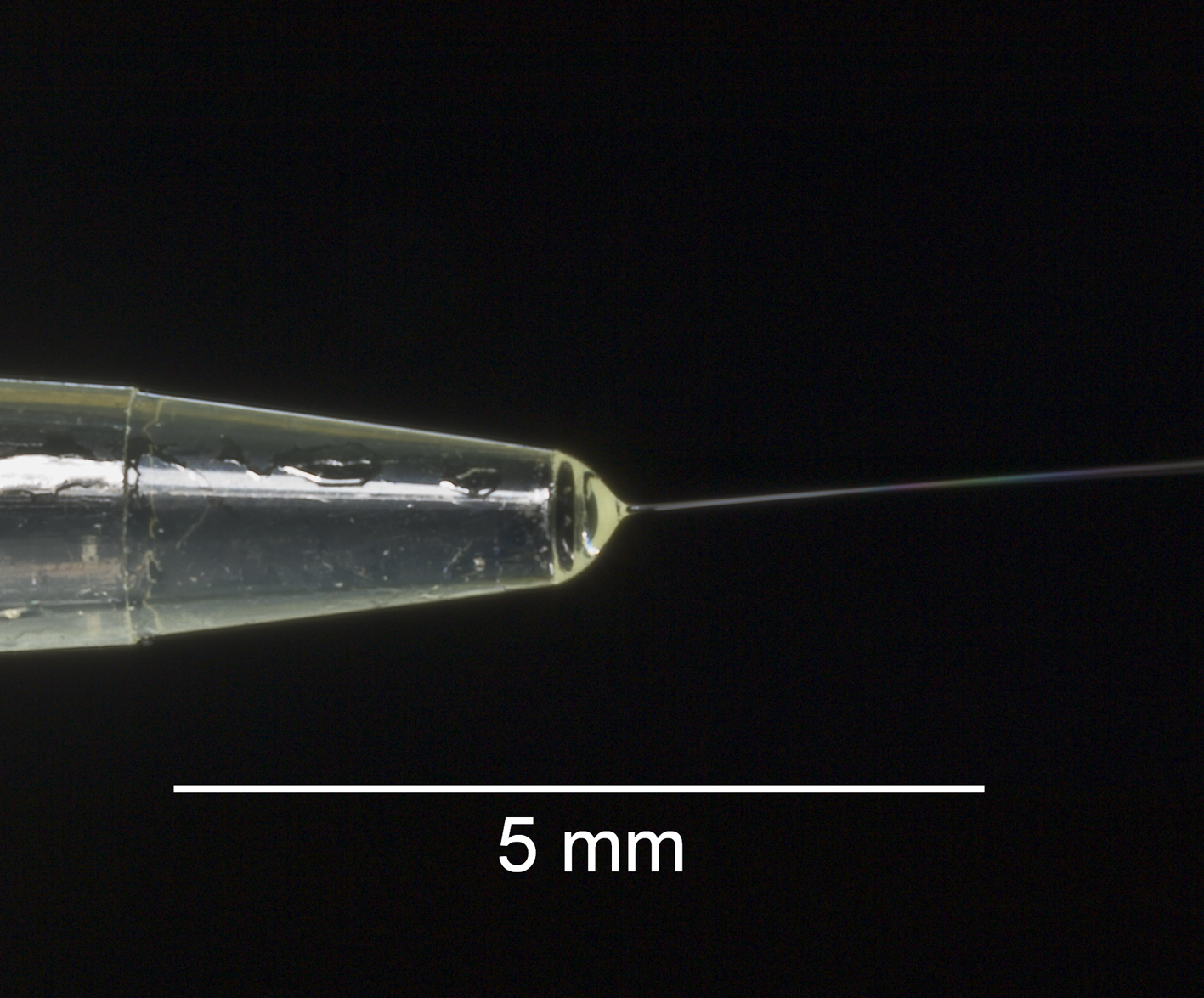
Photograph of a meniscus of polyvinyl alcohol in aqueous solution showing a fibre drawn from a Taylor cone by the process of electrospinning.

A Taylor cone refers to the cone observed in electrospinning, electrospraying and hydrodynamic spray processes from which a jet of charged particles emanates above a threshold voltage. Aside from electrospray ionization in mass spectrometry, the Taylor cone is important in field-emission electric propulsion (FEEP) and colloid thrusters used in fine control and high efficiency (low power) thrust of spacecraft.

== History ==
This cone was described by Sir Geoffrey Ingram Taylor in 1964 before electrospray was "discovered". This work followed on the work of Zeleny who photographed a cone-jet of glycerine in a strong electric field and the work of several others: Wilson and Taylor (1925), Nolan (1926) and Macky (1931). Taylor was primarily interested in the behavior of water droplets in strong electric fields, such as in thunderstorms.

== Formation ==
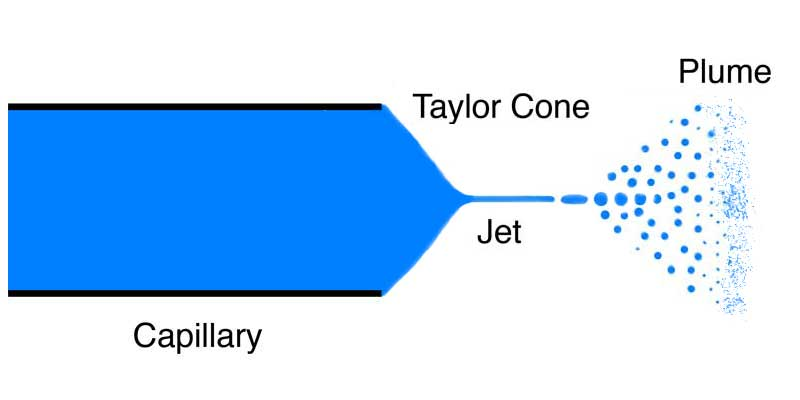
Electrospray diagram depicting the Taylor cone, jet and plume

When a small volume of electrically conductive liquid is exposed to an electric field, the shape of the liquid starts to deform from the shape caused by surface tension alone. The liquid becomes polarized and as the voltage is increased the effect of the electric field becomes more prominent. This causes an intense electric field surrounding the liquid droplet As this effect of the electric field begins to exert a similar magnitude of force on the droplet as the surface tension does, a cone shape begins to form with convex sides and a rounded tip. This approaches the shape of a cone with a whole angle (width) of 98.6°. When a certain threshold voltage has been reached, the slightly rounded tip inverts and emits a jet of liquid. This is called a cone-jet and is the beginning of the electrospraying process in which ions may be transferred to the gas phase. It is generally found that, to achieve a stable cone-jet, a slightly higher-than-threshold voltage must be used. As the voltage is further increased, other modes of droplet disintegration are observed. The term Taylor cone can specifically refer to the theoretical limit of a perfect cone of exactly the predicted angle or generally refer to the approximately conical portion of a cone-jet after the electrospraying process has begun.

Taylor cones can be stationary as cone-jets described previously, or transient, which can form when droplets undergo coulombic explosion.

== Theory ==
Sir Geoffrey Ingram Taylor in 1964 described this phenomenon, theoretically derived based on general assumptions that the requirements to form a perfect cone under such conditions required a semi-vertical angle of 49.3° (a whole angle of 98.6°) and demonstrated that the shape of such a cone approached the theoretical shape just before jet formation. This angle is known as the Taylor angle. This angle is more precisely $\pi-\theta _0\,$ where $\theta _0\,$ is the first zero of $P _{1/2} (\cos\theta _0)\,$(the Legendre function of order 1/2).

Taylor's derivation is based on two assumptions: (1) that the surface of the cone is an equipotential surface and (2) that the cone exists in a steady-state equilibrium. To meet both of these criteria, the electric field must have azimuthal symmetry and have $\sqrt{R}\,$ dependence to counter the surface tension to produce the cone. The solution to this problem is:

$$V=V_0+AR^{1/2}P _{1/2} (\cos\theta _0)\,$$

where $V=V_0\,$ (equipotential surface) exists at a value of $\theta _0$ (regardless of R) producing an equipotential cone. The angle necessary for $V=V_0\,$ for all R is a zero of $P _{1/2} (\cos\theta _0)\,$ between 0 and $\pi\,$ which there is only one at 130.7099°. The complement of this angle is the Taylor angle.
