= Alternating current electrospinning =

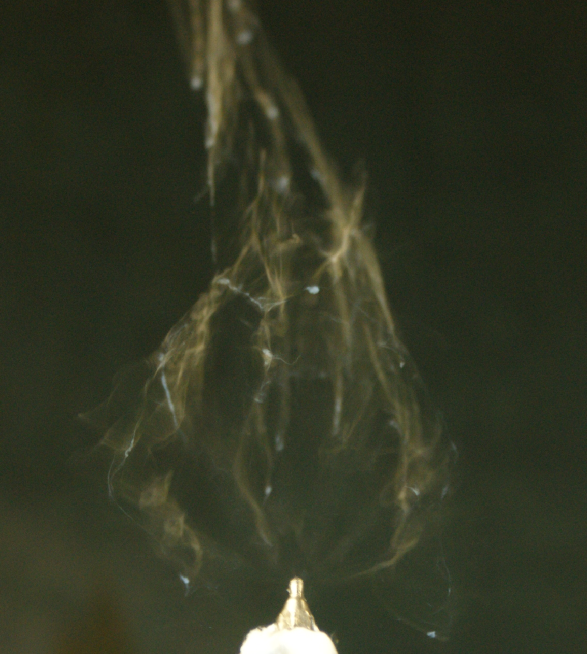
The nanofibrous plume generated during alternating current electrospinning without using a grounded collector.

Alternating current electrospinning is a fiber formation technique to produce micro- and nanofibers from polymer solutions under the dynamic drawing force of the electrostatic field with periodically changing polarity. The main benefit of alternating current electrospinning is that multiple times higher productivities are achievable compared to widely used direct current electrospinning setups.
