= Serial femtosecond crystallography =

Crystallography technique

Serial femtosecond crystallography (SFX) is a form of X-ray crystallography developed for use at X-ray free-electron lasers (XFELs). Single pulses at free-electron lasers are bright enough to generate resolvable Bragg diffraction from sub-micron crystals. However, these pulses also destroy the crystals, meaning that a full data set involves collecting diffraction from many crystals. This method of data collection is referred to as serial, referencing a row of crystals streaming across the X-ray beam, one at a time. It can be performed at room temperature, allowing for the study of biochemical dynamics. It can be used to visualize samples prone to radiation damage, such as metalloproteins, and to observe transient structures, such as reaction intermediates, which would not be captured using conventional X-ray crystallography.

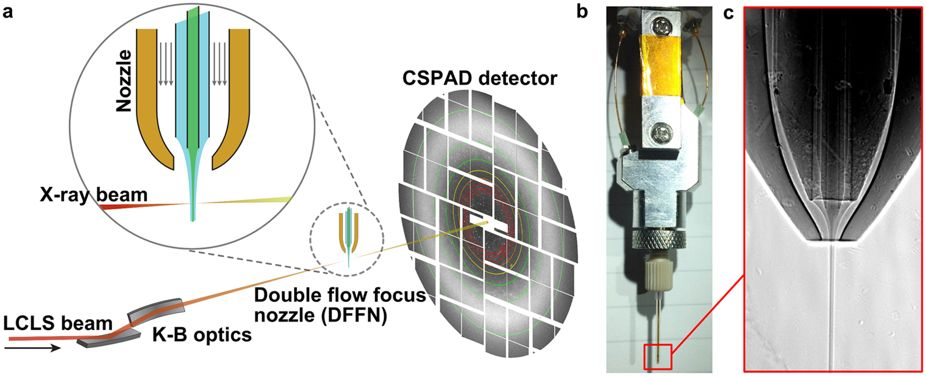
Serial Femtosecond Crystallography (SFX) schematic

== History ==
While the idea of serial crystallography had been proposed earlier, it was first demonstrated with XFELs by Chapman et al. at the Linac Coherent Light Source (LCLS) in 2011. This method has since been extended to solve unknown structures, perform time-resolved experiments, and later even brought back to synchrotron X-ray sources.

== Methods ==
In comparison to conventional crystallography, where a single (relatively large) crystal is rotated in order to collect a 3D data set, some additional methods have to be developed to measure in the serial mode. First, a method is required to efficiently stream crystals across the beam focus. The other major difference is in the data analysis pipeline. Here, each crystal is in a random, unknown orientation which must be computationally determined before the diffraction patterns from all the crystals can be merged into a set of 3D hkℓ intensities.

=== Sample Delivery ===
The first sample delivery system used for this technique was the Gas Dynamic Virtual Nozzle (GDVN) which generates a liquid jet in vacuum (accelerated by a concentric helium gas stream) containing crystals. Since then, many other methods have been successfully demonstrated at both XFELs and synchrotron sources. A summary of these methods along with their key relative features is given below:

- Gas Dynamic Virtual Nozzle (GDVN) - low background scattering, but high sample consumption. Only method available for high repetition rate sources.
- Lipidic Cubic Phase (LCP) injector - Low sample consumption, with relatively high background. Specially suited for membrane proteins
- Other viscous delivery media - Similar to LCP, low sample consumption with high background
- Fixed target scanning systems (wide variety of systems have been used with different features, with standard crystal loops, or silicon chips) - Low sample consumption, background depends on system, mechanically complex
- Tape drive (crystals auto-pipetted onto a Kapton tape and brought to X-ray focus) - Similar to fixed target systems, except with fewer moving parts

=== Data Analysis ===
In order to recover a 3D structure from the individual diffraction patterns, they must be oriented, scaled and merged to generate a list of hkℓ intensities. These intensities can then be passed to standard crystallographic phasing and refinement programs. The first experiments only oriented the patterns and obtained accurate intensity values by averaging over a large number of crystals (> 100,000). Later versions correct for variations in individual pattern properties such as overall intensity variations and B-factor variations as well as refining the orientations to fix the "partialities" of the individual Bragg reflections.
