= John Zeleny =

American physicist and researcher

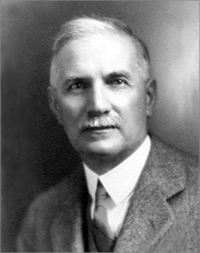
- Born: March 26, 1872; Racine, Wisconsin
- Died: June 19, 1951 (aged 79); New Haven, Connecticut
- Education: University of Minnesota (B.S. 1892, Ph.D. 1906); University of Cambridge (B.A. 1899); Yale University (M.A. (honorary), 1915)
- Known for: Zeleny electroscope electrospray ion mobility
- Scientific career
- Fields: Physicist
- Workplaces: University of Minnesota; Yale University
- Doctoral advisor: Henry T. Eddy
- Other academic advisors: J. J. Thomson

John Zeleny (March 26, 1872 – June 19, 1951) was an American physicist who, in 1911, invented the Zeleny electroscope. He also studied the effect of an electric field on a liquid meniscus. His work is seen by some as a beginning to emergent technologies like liquid metal ion sources and electrospraying and electrospinning.

Zeleny was born in Racine, Wisconsin to a Czech immigrant couple from Křídla. He was the older brother of Charles Zeleny. He attended the University of Minnesota (B.S., 1892), followed by Trinity College, Cambridge (B.A., 1899), and the University of Minnesota (PhD, 1906). Zeleny began his teaching career at the University of Minnesota after earning his B.A. in 1892. Zeleny was an elected member of the American Academy of Arts and Sciences. He was elected to the American Philosophical Society in 1915. That same year, he joined the faculty at Yale, where he was chairman of the physics department and director of graduate studies in physics until his retirement in 1940.
