= Křídla =

- Municipality
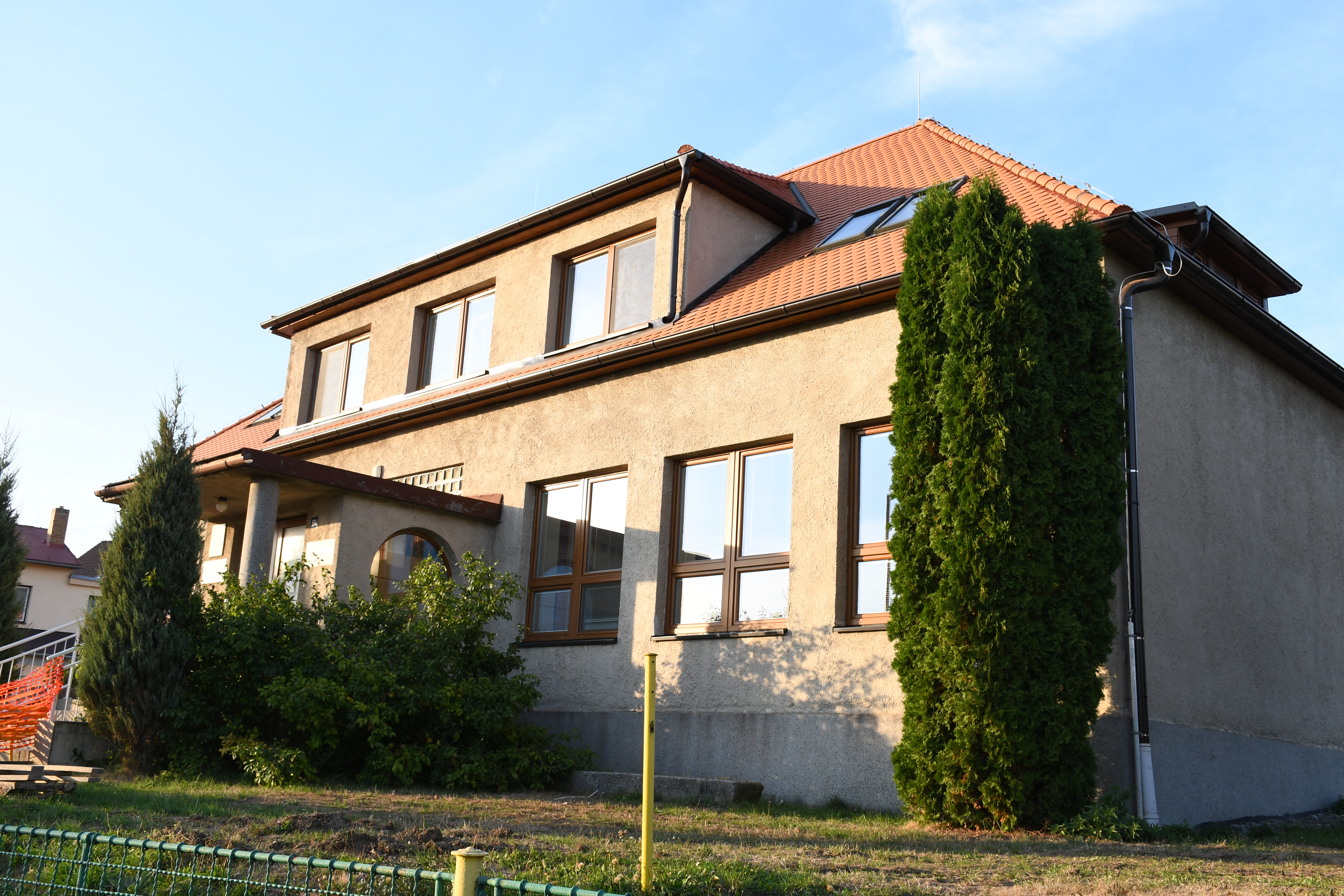
- Primary school and kindergarten

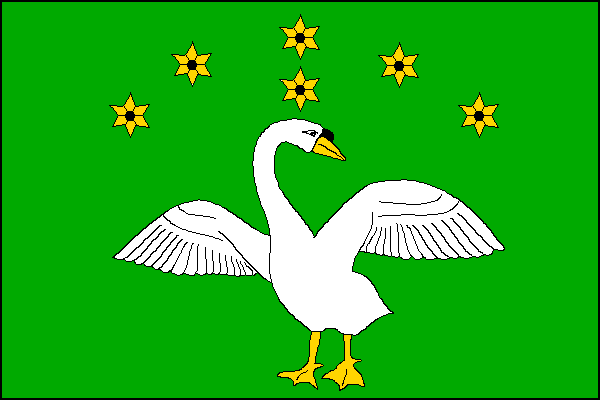
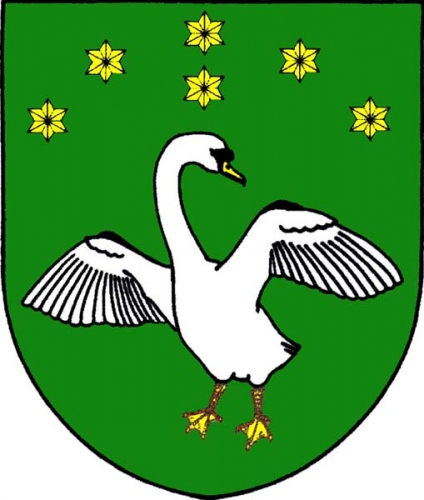
- Flag Coat of arms

- Location in the Czech Republic
- Coordinates: 49°31′38″N 16°7′21″E
- Country: Czech Republic
- Region: Vysočina
- District: Žďár nad Sázavou
- First mentioned: 1376

Area
  - Total: 4.54 km^{2} (1.75 sq mi)
- Elevation: 583 m (1,913 ft)

Population (2026-01-01)
  - Total: 369
  - Density: 81.3/km^{2} (211/sq mi)
- Time zone: UTC+1 (CET)
  - Summer (DST): UTC+2 (CEST)
- Postal code: 592 31
- Website: www.obeckridla.cz

Křídla is a municipality and village in Žďár nad Sázavou District in the Vysočina Region of the Czech Republic. It has about 400 inhabitants.

Křídla lies approximately 14 kilometres (9 mi) east of Žďár nad Sázavou, 42 km (26 mi) east of Jihlava, and 138 km (86 mi) south-east of Prague.

== Demographics ==
Historical population
Year	Pop.	±%
1869	352	—
1880	366	+4.0%
1890	354	−3.3%
1900	321	−9.3%
1910	354	+10.3%
1921	334	−5.6%
1930	314	−6.0%
1950	276	−12.1%
1961	283	+2.5%
1970	289	+2.1%
1980	281	−2.8%
1991	276	−1.8%
2001	270	−2.2%
2011	328	+21.5%
2021	368	+12.2%
Source: Censuses
