= Electrospray =

Apparatus that employs electricity to disperse a liquid into fine aerosol

The name electrospray is used for an apparatus that employs electricity to disperse a liquid or for the fine aerosol resulting from this process. High voltage is applied to a liquid supplied through an emitter (usually a glass or metallic capillary). Ideally the liquid reaching the emitter tip forms a Taylor cone, which emits a liquid jet through its apex. Varicose waves on the surface of the jet lead to the formation of small and highly charged liquid droplets, which are radially dispersed due to Coulomb repulsion.

== History ==
In the late 16th century William Gilbert set out to describe the behaviour of magnetic and electrostatic phenomena. He observed that, in the presence of a charged piece of amber, a drop of water deformed into a cone. This effect is clearly related to electrosprays, even though Gilbert did not record any observation related to liquid dispersion under the effect of the electric field.

In 1750 the French clergyman and physicist Jean-Antoine (Abbé) Nollet noted water flowing from a vessel would aerosolize if the vessel was electrified and placed near electrical ground.

In 1882, Lord Rayleigh theoretically estimated the maximum amount of charge a liquid droplet could carry; this is now known as the "Rayleigh limit". He predicted that a droplet reaching this limit would throw out fine jets of liquid. This was confirmed in 1994.

In 1914, John Zeleny published work on the behaviour of fluid droplets at the end of glass capillaries. This report presents experimental evidence for several electrospray operating regimes (dripping, burst, pulsating, and cone-jet). A few years later, Zeleny captured the first time-lapse images of the dynamic liquid meniscus.

Between 1964 and 1969 Sir Geoffrey Ingram Taylor produced the theoretical underpinning of electrospraying. Taylor modeled the shape of the cone formed by the fluid droplet under the effect of an electric field; this characteristic droplet shape is now known as the Taylor cone. He further worked with J. R. Melcher to develop the "leaky dielectric model" for conducting fluids.

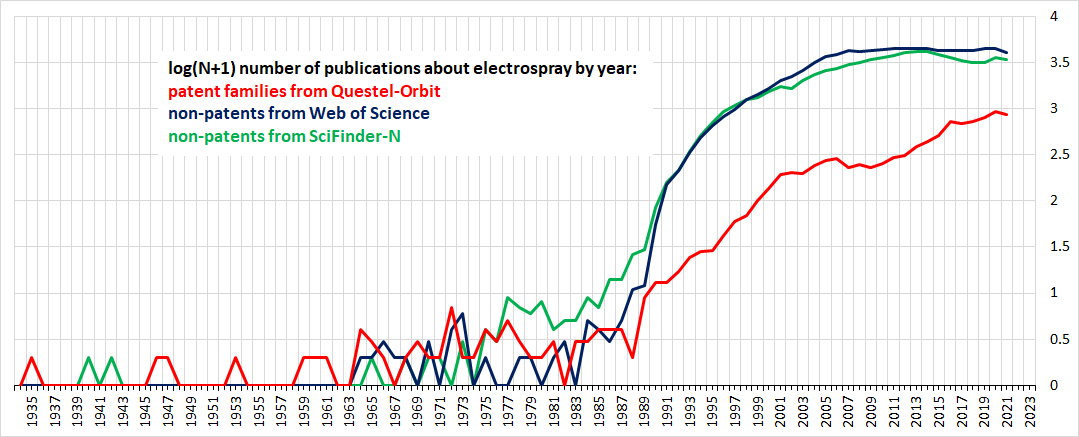
log(N+1) number of publications about electrospray by year: patent families from Questel-Orbit, non-patents from Web of Science and from SciFinder-N.

The number of publications about electrospray started rising significantly around 1990 (as shown in the figure on the right) when John Fenn (2002 Nobel Prize in Chemistry) and others discovered electrospray ionization for mass spectrometry.

== Mechanism ==
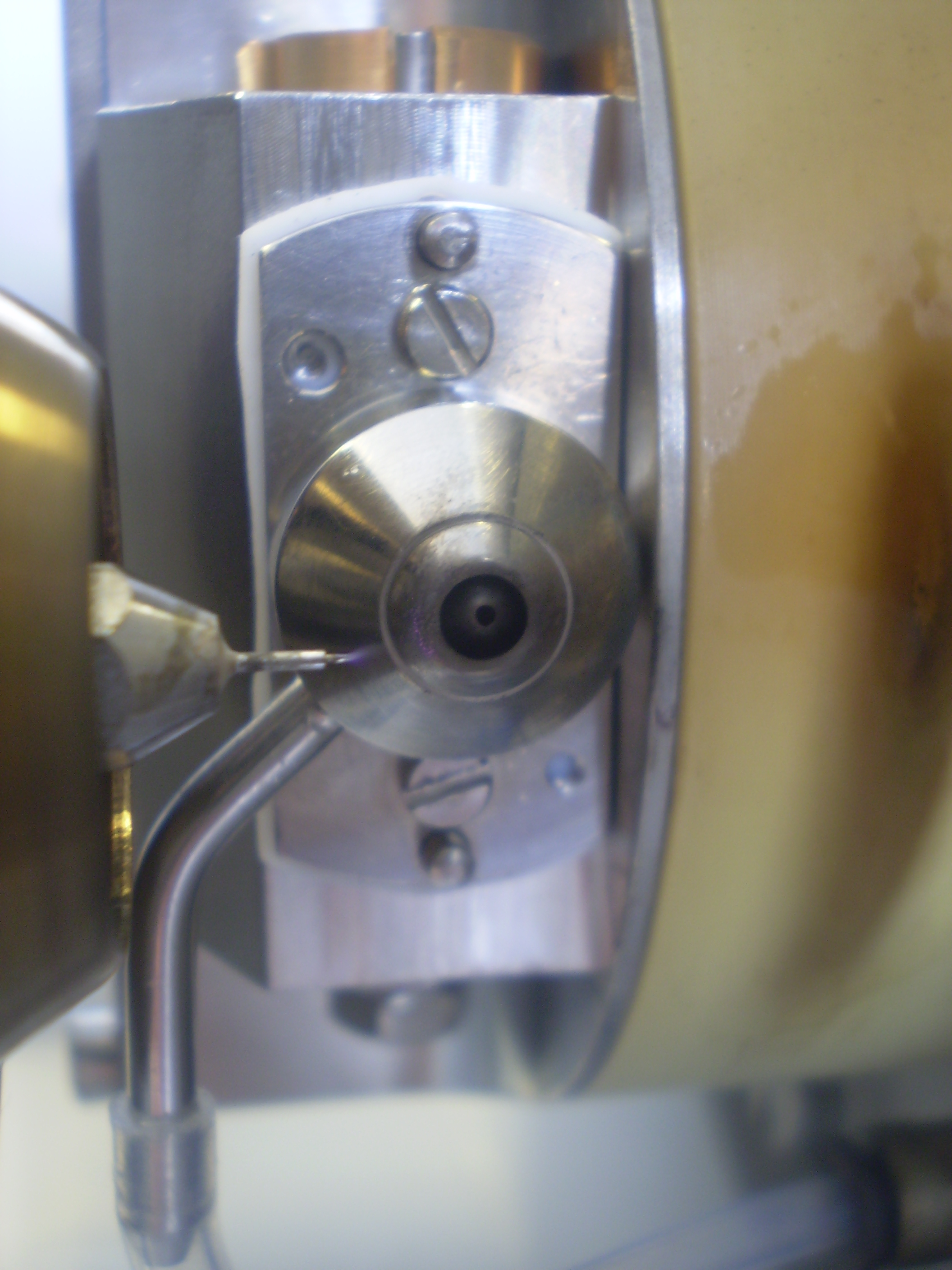
A close-up of an electrospray device, with emitter tip in foreground pointing to the right. The jet of ionised spray is visible within the image.

To simplify the discussion, the following paragraphs will address the case of a positive electrospray with the high voltage applied to a metallic emitter. A classical electrospray setup is considered, with the emitter situated at a distance $d\,$ from a grounded counter-electrode. The liquid being sprayed is characterized by its viscosity $(\mu)\,$, surface tension $(\gamma)\,$, conductivity $(\kappa)\,$, and relative permittivity $(\epsilon_r)\,$.

=== Effect of small electric fields on liquid menisci ===
Under the effect of surface tension, the liquid meniscus assumes a semi-spherical shape at the tip of the emitter. Application of the positive voltage $V\,$ will induce the electric field:

$$E={2V \over r \ln(4d/r)}$$

where $r\,$ is the liquid radius of curvature. This field leads to liquid polarization: the negative/positive charge carriers migrate toward/away from the electrode where the voltage is applied. At voltages below a certain threshold, the liquid quickly reaches a new equilibrium geometry with a smaller radius of curvature.

=== The Taylor cone ===
Voltages above the threshold draw the liquid into a cone. Sir Geoffrey Ingram Taylor described the theoretical shape of this cone based on the assumptions that (1) the surface of the cone is equipotential and (2) the cone exists in a steady state equilibrium. To meet both of these criteria the electric field must have azimuthal symmetry and have $R^{1/2}\,$ dependence to balance the surface tension and produce the cone. The solution to this problem is:

$$V=V_0+AR^{1/2}P _{1/2} (\cos\theta _0)\,$$

where $V=V_0\,$ (equipotential surface) exists at a value of $\theta _0$ (regardless of R) producing an equipotential cone. The angle necessary for $V=V_0\,$ for all R values is a zero of the Legendre polynomial of order 1/2, $P _{1/2} (\cos\theta _0)\,$. There is only one zero between 0 and $\pi\,$ at 130.7°, which is the complement of the Taylor's now famous 49.3° angle.

=== Singularity development ===
The apex of the conical meniscus cannot become infinitely small. A singularity develops when the hydrodynamic relaxation time $\tau_H={\mu r \over \gamma}$ becomes larger than the charge relaxation time $\tau_C={\epsilon_r\epsilon_0 \over \kappa}$. The undefined symbols stand for characteristic length $(r)\,$ and vacuum permittivity $(\epsilon_0)\,$. Due to intrinsic varicose instability, the charged liquid jet ejected through the cone apex breaks into small charged droplets, which are radially dispersed by the space-charge.

=== Closing the electrical circuit ===
The charged liquid is ejected through the cone apex and captured on the counter electrode as charged droplets or positive ions. To balance the charge loss, the excess negative charge is neutralized electrochemically at the emitter. Imbalances between the amount of charge generated electrochemically and the amount of charge lost at the cone apex can lead to several electrospray operating regimes. For cone-jet electrosprays, the potential at the metal/liquid interface self-regulates to generate the same amount of charge as that lost through the cone apex.

== Applications ==
=== Electrospray ionization ===
Electrospray became widely used as ionization source for mass spectrometry after the Fenn group successfully demonstrated its use as ion source for the analysis of large biomolecules.

=== Liquid metal ion source ===
A liquid metal ion source (LMIS) uses electrospray in conjunction with liquid metal to form ions. Ions are produced by field evaporation at tip of the Taylor cone. Ions from a LMIS are used in ion implantation and in focused ion beam instruments.

=== Electrospinning ===
Similarly to the standard electrospray, the application of high voltage to a polymer solution can result in the formation of a cone-jet geometry. If the jet turns into very fine fibers instead of breaking into small droplets, the process is known as electrospinning .

=== Colloid thrusters ===
Electrospray techniques are used as low thrust electric propulsion rocket engines to control satellites, since the fine-controllable particle ejection allows precise and effective thrust.

=== Deposition of particles for nanostructures ===
Electrospray may be used in nanotechnology, for example to deposit single particles on surfaces. This is done by spraying colloids on average containing only one particle per droplet. The solvent evaporates, leaving an aerosol stream of single particles of the desired type. The ionizing property of the process is not crucial for the application but may be used in electrostatic precipitation of the particles.

=== Deposition of ions as precursors for nanoparticles and nanostructures ===
Nanostructures can be fabricated in situ by directing metal ions to specific locations using NESA-FEBID (nanoelectrospray-assisted focused electron beam induced deposition), in which electrospray delivers precursor ions while the electron beam drives electrochemical reduction of the ions to form the metal.

=== Fabrication of drug carriers ===
Electrospray has garnered attention in the field of drug delivery, and it has been used to fabricate drug carriers including polymer microparticles used in immunotherapy as well as lipoplexes used for nucleic acid delivery. The sub-micrometer-sized drug particles created by electrospray possess increased dissolution rates, thus increased bioavailability due to the increased surface area. The side-effects of drugs can thus be reduced, as smaller dosage is enough for the same effect.

=== Air purifiers ===
Electrospray is used in some air purifiers. Particulate suspended in air can be charged by aerosol electrospray, manipulated by an electric field, and collected on a grounded electrode. This approach minimizes the production of ozone which is common to other types of air purifiers.

== See also ==
- Flow focusing
