= Frank Sobott =

German chemist

Frank Sobott, Ph.D. (2000), is a German chemist, who is active in the fields of mass spectrometry and biochemistry; he is a professor of the University of Leeds from February 2017. He obtained a PhD in physical and theoretical chemistry in 2000 at the Johann Wolfgang Goethe University Frankfurt am Main, under the supervision of professors Bernhard Brutschy and Michael Karas. He was an associate professor of mass spectrometry at the Center for Proteomics of the University of Antwerp, Belgium, from 2009 to 2017.

== Works ==
- Frank Sobott: Charakterisierung und Anwendung der LILBID-Laserdesorptions-Massenspektrometrie, Thesis/dissertation, Berlin, Frankfurt: Dissertation.de, 2001.

== Web-sources ==
- "Prof Frank Sobott: Mass Spectrometry, Ion Mobility Spectrometry, Structural Proteomics, Biomolecular Analysis". Chair of Biomolecular Mass Spectrometry, University of Leeds. 2017.
- "Prof. Frank Sobott: Chair in Biomolecular Mass Spectrometry". Faculty of Biological Sciences, University of Leeds. 2017.
