= History of mass spectrometry =

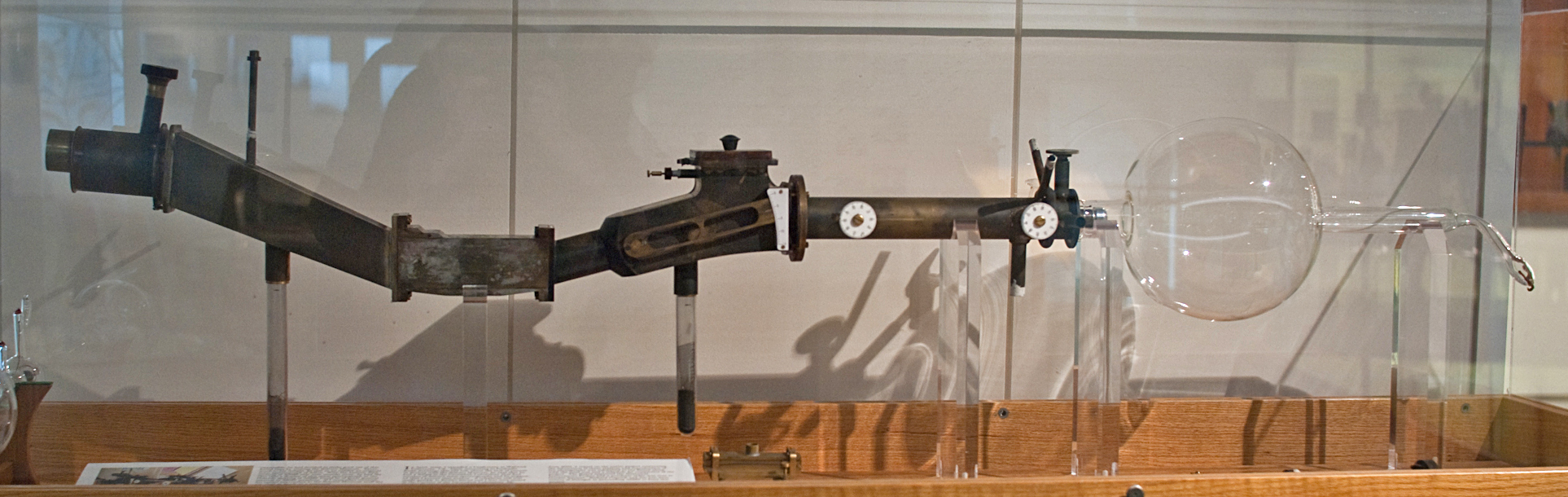
Replica of F. W. Aston's third mass spectrograph.

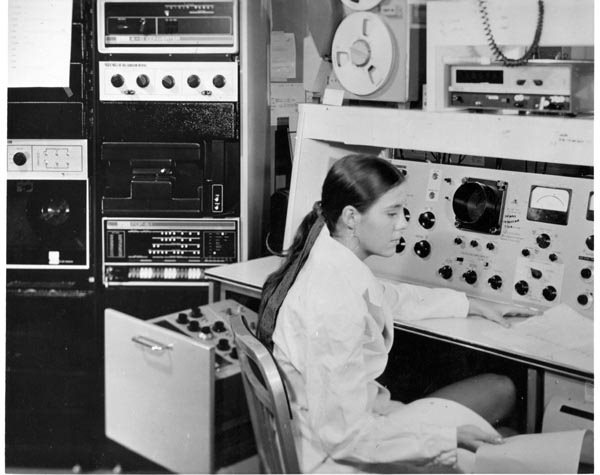
A mass spectrometer in use at NIH in 1975

The history of mass spectrometry has its roots in physical and chemical studies regarding the nature of matter. The study of gas discharges in the mid 19th century led to the discovery of anode and cathode rays, which turned out to be positive ions and electrons. Improved capabilities in the separation of these positive ions enabled the discovery of stable isotopes of the elements. The first such discovery was with the element neon, which was shown by mass spectrometry to have at least two stable isotopes: ^{20}Ne (neon with 10 protons and 10 neutrons) and ^{22}Ne (neon with 10 protons and 12 neutrons). Mass spectrometers were used in the Manhattan Project for the separation of isotopes of uranium necessary to create the atomic bomb.

== Prout's Hypothesis ==
Prout's hypothesis was an early 19th-century attempt to explain the properties of the chemical elements using the internal structure of the atom. In 1815, the English chemist William Prout observed that the atomic weights that had been measured were integer multiples of the atomic weight of hydrogen. Prout's hypothesis remained influential in chemistry throughout the 1820s. However, more careful measurements of the atomic weights, such as those compiled by Jöns Jakob Berzelius in 1828 or Edward Turner in 1832, appeared to disprove it. In particular the atomic weight of chlorine, which is 35.45 times that of hydrogen, could not at the time be explained in terms of Prout's hypothesis. It would take the better part of a century for this problem to be resolved.

== Canal rays ==
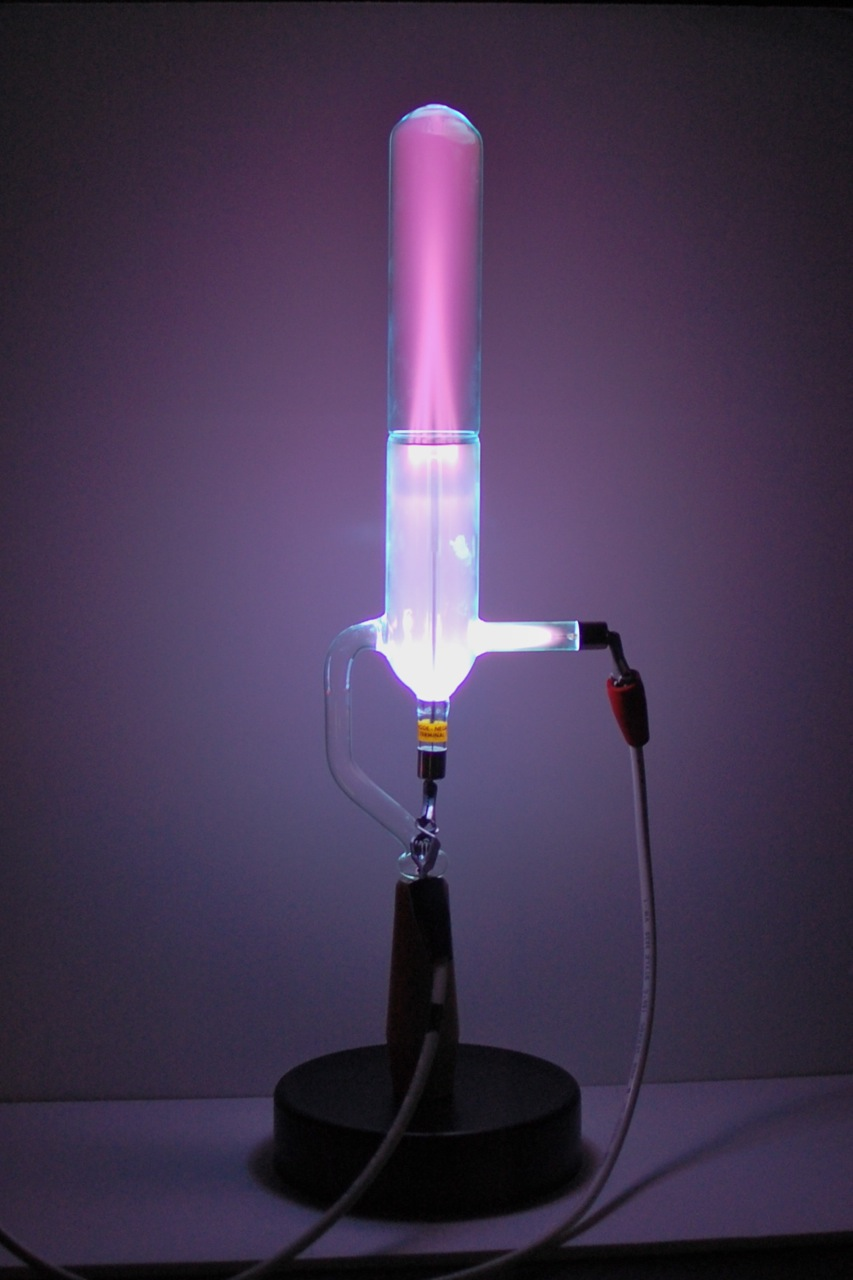
Canal ray (anode ray) tube

In the mid-nineteenth century, Julius Plücker investigated the light emitted in discharge tubes and the influence of magnetic fields on the glow. Later, in 1869, Johann Wilhelm Hittorf studied discharge tubes with energy rays extending from a negative electrode, the cathode. These rays produced a fluorescence when they hit a tube's glass walls, and when interrupted by a solid object they cast a shadow.

Canal rays, also called anode rays, were observed by Eugen Goldstein, in 1886. Goldstein used a gas discharge tube which had a perforated cathode. The rays are produced in the holes (canals) in the cathode and travels in a direction opposite to the "cathode rays," which are streams of electrons. Goldstein called these positive rays "Kanalstrahlen" - canal rays.

== Discovery of isotopes ==
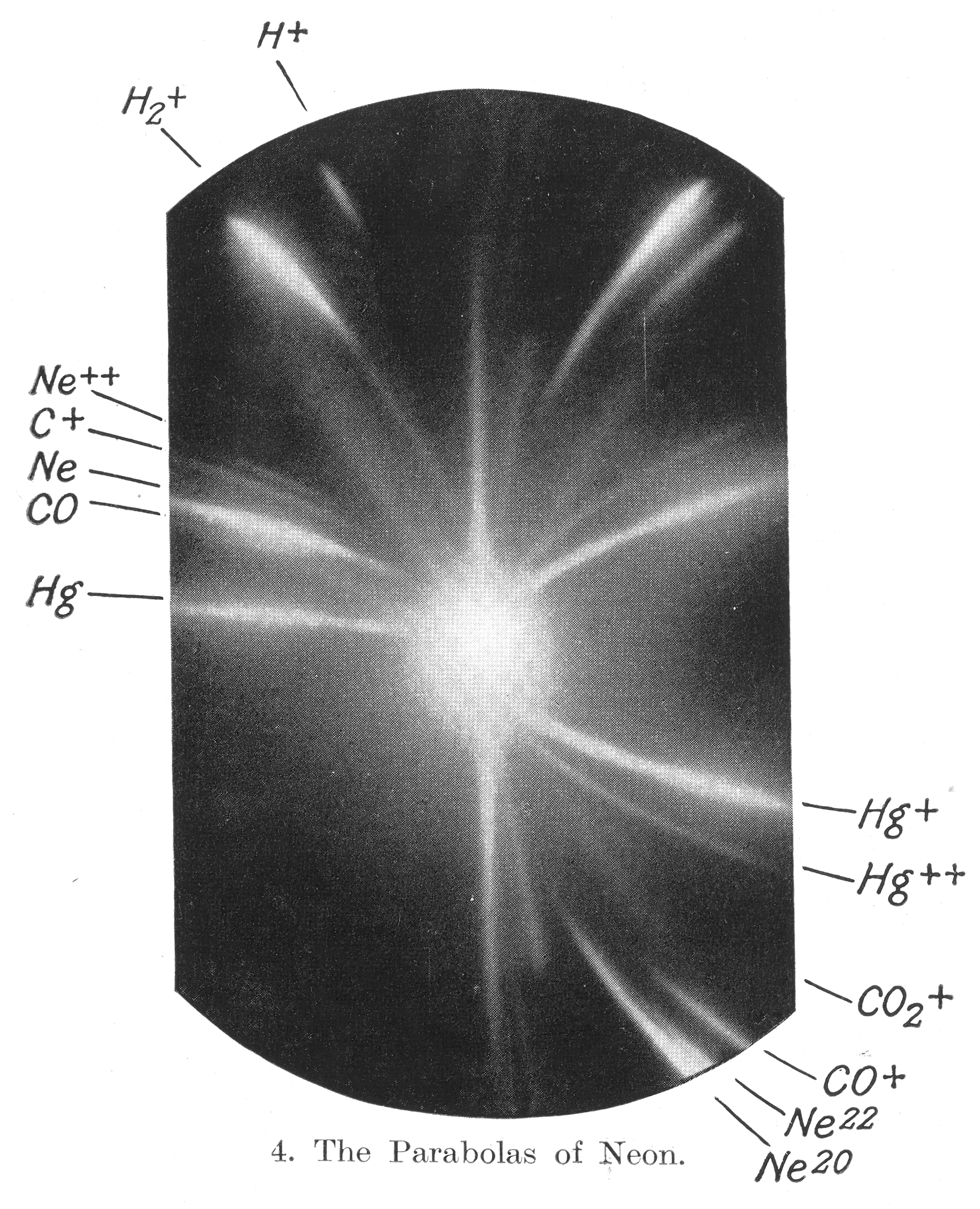
In the bottom right corner of this photographic plate are markings for the two isotopes of neon: neon-20 and neon-22.

In 1913, as part of his exploration into the composition of canal rays, J. J. Thomson channeled a stream of ionized neon through a magnetic and an electric field and measured its deflection by placing a photographic plate in its path. Thomson observed two patches of light on the photographic plate (see image on left), which suggested two different parabolas of deflection. Thomson concluded that the neon gas was composed of atoms of two different atomic masses (neon-20 and neon-22).

Thomson's student Francis William Aston continued the research at the Cavendish Laboratory in Cambridge, building the first full functional mass spectrometer that was reported in 1919. He was able to identify isotopes of chlorine (35 and 37), bromine (79 and 81), and krypton (78, 80, 82, 83, 84 and 86), proving that these natural occurring elements are composed of a combination of isotopes. The use of electromagnetic focusing in mass spectrograph which rapidly allowed him to identify no fewer than 212 of the 287 naturally occurring isotopes. In 1921, F. W. Aston became a fellow of the Royal Society and received a Nobel Prize in Chemistry in the following year.

His work on isotopes also led to his formulation of the Whole Number Rule which states that "the mass of the oxygen isotope being defined [as 16], all the other isotopes have masses that are very nearly whole numbers," a rule that was used extensively in the development of nuclear energy. The exact mass of many isotopes was measured leading to the result that hydrogen has a 1% higher mass than expected by the average mass of the other elements. Aston speculated about the subatomic energy and the use of it in 1936.

In 1918, Arthur Jeffrey Dempster reported on his mass spectrometer and established the basic theory and design of mass spectrometers that is still used to this day. Dempster's research over his career centered around the mass spectrometer and its applications, leading in 1935 to his discovery of the uranium isotope ^{235}U. This isotope's ability to cause a rapidly expanding fission nuclear chain reaction allowed the development of the atom bomb and nuclear power.

In 1932, Kenneth Bainbridge developed a mass spectrometer with a resolving power of 600 and a relative precision of one part in 10,000. He used this instrument to verify the equivalence of mass and energy, E = mc^{2}.

== Manhattan Project ==
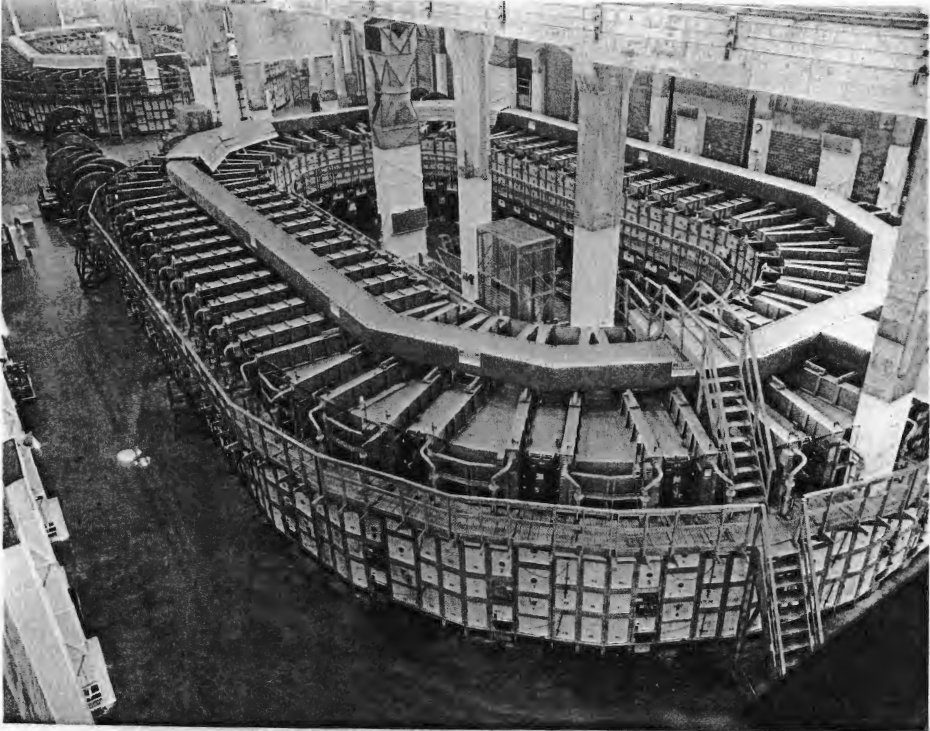
Calutron mass spectrometers at the Y-12 Plant in Oak Ridge, Tennessee ca. 1945

A Calutron is a sector mass spectrometer that was used for separating the isotopes of uranium developed by Ernest O. Lawrence during the Manhattan Project and was similar to the Cyclotron invented by Lawrence. Its name is a concatenation of Cal. U.-tron, in tribute to the University of California, Lawrence's institution and the contractor of the Los Alamos laboratory. They were implemented for industrial scale uranium enrichment at the Oak Ridge, Tennessee Y-12 plant established during the war and provided much of the uranium used for the "Little Boy" nuclear weapon, which was dropped onto Hiroshima in 1945.

== Development of gas chromatography-mass spectrometry ==
The use of a mass spectrometer as the detector in gas chromatography was developed during the 1950s by Roland Gohlke and Fred McLafferty. The development of affordable and miniaturized computers has helped in the simplification of the use of this instrument, as well as allowed great improvements in the time taken to analyze a sample.

== Fourier transform mass spectrometry ==
Fourier transform ion cyclotron resonance mass spectrometry was developed by Alan G. Marshall and Melvin B. Comisarow at the University of British Columbia in 1974. The inspiration was earlier developments in conventional ICR and Fourier Transform Nuclear Magnetic Resonance (FT-NMR) spectroscopy.

== Soft ionization methods ==
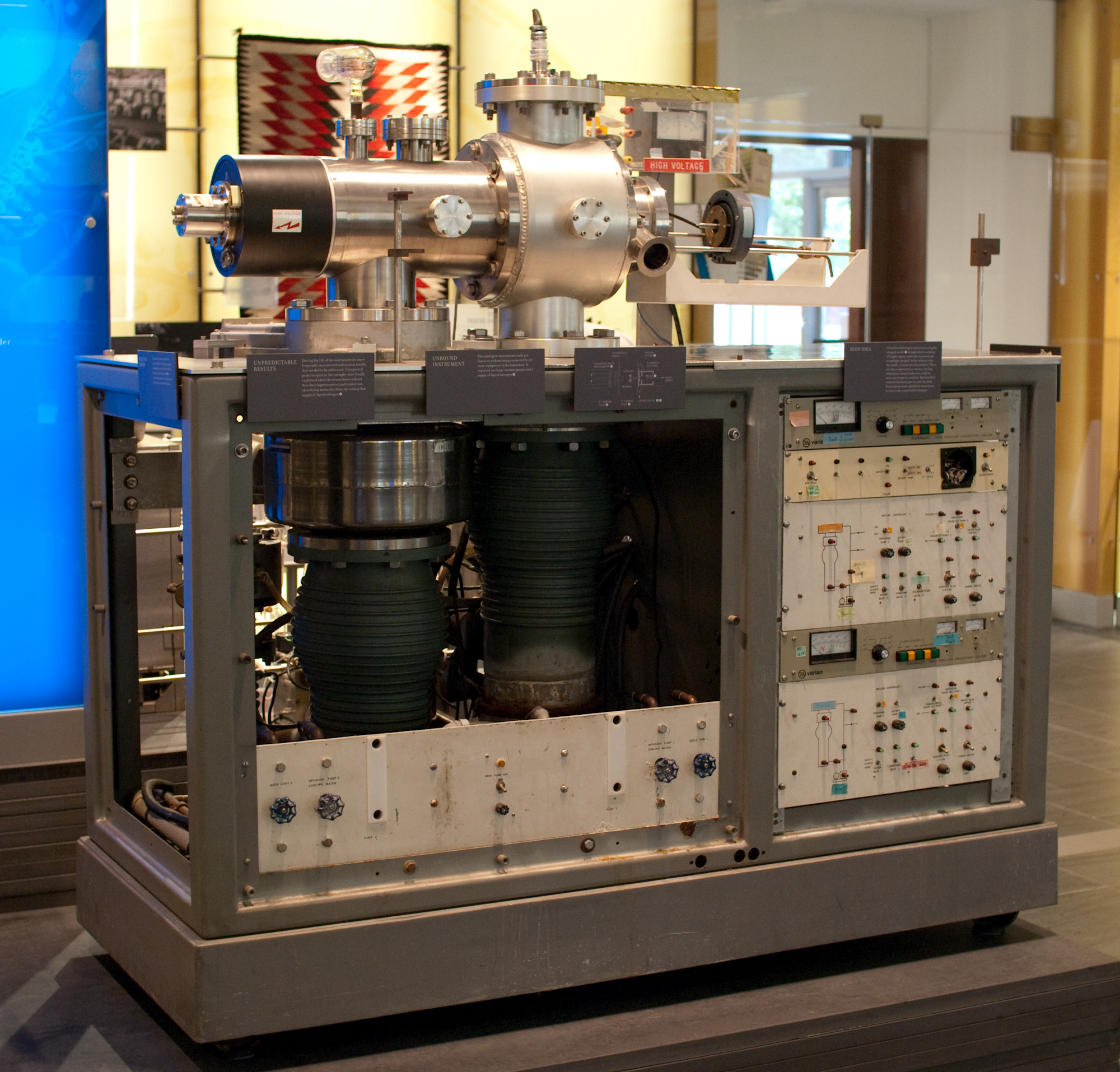
Single quadrupole mass spectrometer used for John Fenn's Nobel Prize winning work on electrospray ionization

Field desorption ionization was first reported by Beckey in 1969. In field ionization, a high-potential electric field is applied to an emitter with a sharp surface, such as a razor blade, or more commonly, a filament from which tiny "whiskers" have been grown. This produces a very high electric field in which electron tunneling can result in ionization of gaseous analyte molecules. FI produces mass spectra with little or no fragmentation, dominated by molecular radical cations M^{+.} and occasionally protonated molecules $[M+H]^+$.

Chemical ionization was developed in the 1960s. Ionization of sample (analyte) is achieved by interaction of its molecules with reagent ions. The analyte is ionized by ion-molecule reactions during collisions in the source. The process may involve transfer of an electron, a proton or other charged species between the reactants. This is a less energetic procedure than electron ionization and the ions produced are, for example, protonated molecules: [M + H]^{+}. These ions are often relatively stable, tending not to fragment as readily as ions produced by electron ionization.

Matrix-assisted laser desorption/ionization (MALDI) is a soft ionization technique used in mass spectrometry, allowing the analysis of biomolecules (biopolymers such as proteins, peptides and sugars) and large organic molecules (such as polymers, dendrimers and other macromolecules), which tend to be fragile and fragment when ionized by more conventional ionization methods. It is most similar in character to electrospray ionization both in relative softness and the ions produced (although it causes much fewer multiply charged ions). The term was first used in 1985 by Franz Hillenkamp, Michael Karas and their colleagues. These researchers found that the amino acid alanine could be ionized more easily if it was mixed with the amino acid tryptophan and irradiated with a pulsed 266 nm laser. The tryptophan was absorbing the laser energy and helping to ionize the non-absorbing alanine. Peptides up to the 2843 Da peptide melittin could be ionized when mixed with this kind of "matrix".

The breakthrough for large molecule laser desorption ionization came in 1987 when Koichi Tanaka of Shimadzu Corp. and his co-workers used what they called the "ultra fine metal plus liquid matrix method" that combined 30 nm cobalt particles in glycerol with a 337 nm nitrogen laser for ionization. Using this laser and matrix combination, Tanaka was able to ionize biomolecules as large as the 34,472 Da protein carboxypeptidase-A. Tanaka received one-quarter of the 2002 Nobel Prize in Chemistry for demonstrating that, with the proper combination of laser wavelength and matrix, a protein can be ionized. Karas and Hillenkamp were subsequently able to ionize the 67 kDa protein albumin using a nicotinic acid matrix and a 266 nm laser. Further improvements were realized through the use of a 355 nm laser and the cinnamic acid derivatives ferulic acid, caffeic acid and sinapinic acid as the matrix. The availability of small and relatively inexpensive nitrogen lasers operating at 337 nm wavelength and the first commercial instruments introduced in the early 1990s brought MALDI to an increasing number of researchers. Today, mostly organic matrices are used for MALDI mass spectrometry.

== Timeline ==
=== 19th century ===
1886

Eugen Goldstein observes canal rays.

1898

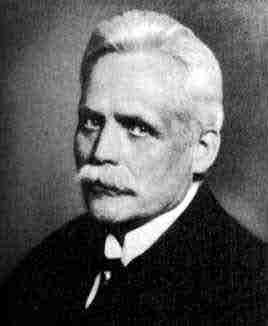
Wilhelm Wien

Wilhelm Wien demonstrates that canal rays can be deflected using strong electric and magnetic fields. He shows that the mass-to-charge ratio of the particles have opposite polarity and is much larger compared to the electron. He also realizes that the particle mass is similar to that of the hydrogen particle.

1898

J. J. Thomson measures the mass-to-charge ratio of electrons.

=== 20th century ===
1901

Walter Kaufmann uses a mass spectrometer to measure the relativistic mass increase of electrons.

1905

J. J. Thomson begins his study of positive rays.

1906

Thomson is awarded the Nobel Prize in Physics "in recognition of the great merits of his theoretical and experimental investigations on the conduction of electricity by gases"

1913

Thomson is able to separate particles of different mass-to-charge ratios. He separates the ^{20}Ne and the ^{22}Ne isotopes, and he correctly identifies the m/z = 11 signal as a doubly charged ^{22}Ne particle.

1919

Francis Aston constructs the first velocity focusing mass spectrograph with mass resolving power of 130.

1922

Aston is awarded the Nobel Prize in chemistry "for his discovery, by means of his mass spectrograph, of isotopes, in a large number of non-radioactive elements, and for his enunciation of the whole-number rule."

1931

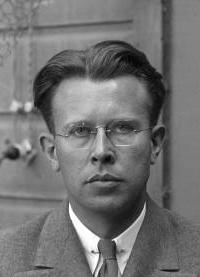
Ernest O. Lawrence

Ernest O. Lawrence invents the cyclotron.

1934

Josef Mattauch and Richard Herzog develop the double-focusing mass spectrograph.

1936

Arthur J. Dempster develops the spark ionization source.

1937

Aston constructs a mass spectrograph with resolving power of 2000.

1939

Lawrence receives the Nobel Prize in Physics for the cyclotron.

1942

Lawrence develops the Calutron for uranium isotope separation.

1943

Westinghouse markets its mass spectrometer and proclaims it to be "A New Electronic Method for fast, accurate gas analysis".

1946

William Stephens presents the concept of a time-of-flight mass spectrometer.

1953

Wolfgang Paul and Helmut Steinwedel introduce the quadrupole mass filter.

1954

A. J. C. Nicholson (Australia) proposes a hydrogen transfer reaction that will come to be known as the McLafferty rearrangement.

1959

Researchers at Dow Chemical interface a gas chromatograph to a mass spectrometer.

1964

British Mass Spectrometry Society established as first dedicated mass spectrometry society. It holds its first meeting in 1965 in London.

1966

F. H. Field and M. S. B. Munson develop chemical ionization.

1968

Malcolm Dole develops electrospray ionization.

1969

H. D. Beckey develops field desorption.

1974

Comisarow and Marshall develop Fourier Transform Ion Cyclotron Resonance mass spectrometry.

1976

Ronald MacFarlane and co-workers develop plasma desorption mass spectrometry.

1984

John Bennett Fenn and co-workers use electrospray to ionize biomolecules.

1985

Franz Hillenkamp, Michael Karas and co-workers describe and coin the term matrix-assisted laser desorption ionization (MALDI).

1987

Koichi Tanaka uses the "ultra fine metal plus liquid matrix method" to ionize intact proteins.

1989

Wolfgang Paul receives the Nobel Prize in Physics "for the development of the ion trap technique".

1999

Alexander Makarov presents the Orbitrap mass spectrometer.

=== 21st century ===
2002

John Bennett Fenn and Koichi Tanaka are awarded one-quarter of the Nobel Prize in chemistry each "for the development of soft desorption ionisation methods ... for mass spectrometric analyses of biological macromolecules."

2005

Commercialization of Orbitrap MS

2008

ASMS Distinguished Contribution in Mass Spectrometry Award

== See also ==
- Mass spectrometry
- History of chemistry
- History of physics

== Bibliography ==
- Measuring Mass: From Positive Rays to Proteins by Michael A. Grayson (Editor) (ISBN 0-941901-31-9)
- Maher, Simon; Jjunju, Fred P. M.; Taylor, Stephen (2015). "Colloquium: 100 years of mass spectrometry: Perspectives and future trends". Rev. Mod. Phys. 87: 113–135. Bibcode:2015RvMP...87..113M. doi:10.1103/RevModPhys.87.113. S2CID 123455617.
