= Surface-assisted laser desorption/ionization =

Surface-assisted laser desorption/ionization (SALDI) is a soft laser desorption technique used for mass spectrometry analysis of biomolecules, polymers, and small organic molecules. In its first embodiment Koichi Tanaka used a cobalt/glycerol liquid matrix and subsequent applications included a graphite/glycerol liquid matrix as well as a solid surface of porous silicon. The porous silicon represents the first matrix-free SALDI surface analysis allowing for facile detection of intact molecular ions, these porous silicon surfaces also facilitated the analysis of small molecules at the yoctomole level. At present laser desorption/ionization methods using other inorganic matrices such as nanomaterials are often regarded as SALDI variants. As an example, silicon nanowires as well as Titania nanotube arrays (NTA) have been used as substrates to detect small molecules. SALDI is used to detect proteins and protein-protein complexes. A related method named "ambient SALDI" - which is a combination of conventional SALDI with ambient mass spectrometry incorporating the direct analysis real time (DART) ion source has also been demonstrated. SALDI is considered one of the most important techniques in MS and has many applications.

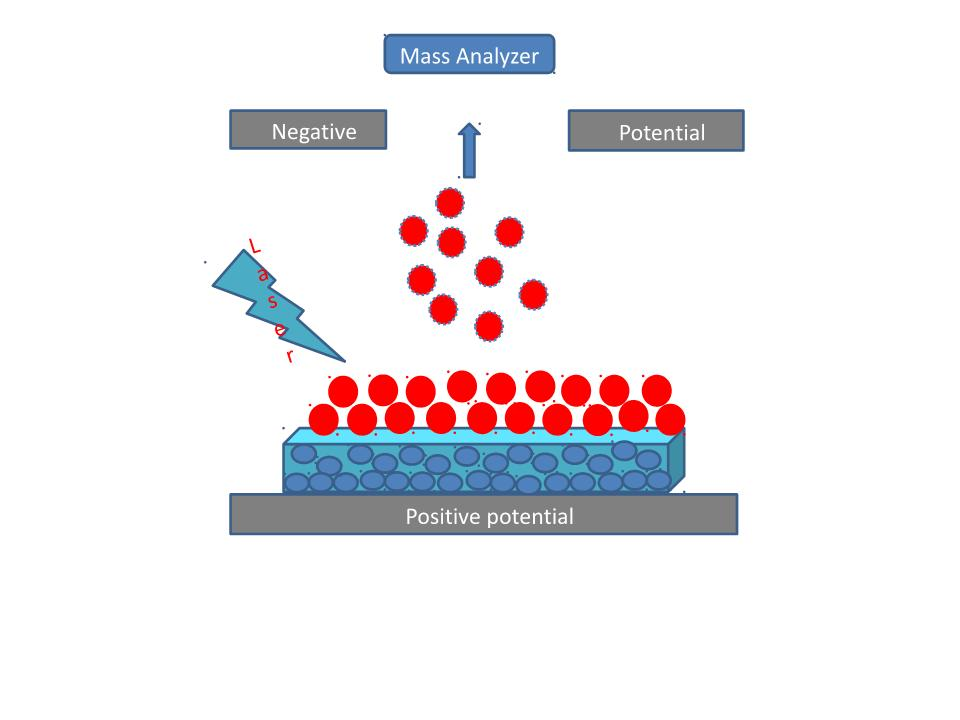
Schematic diagram of surface assisted laser desorption /ionization The blue circles represent the surface particles, the red circles represent the analyte molecules and the red circles with charges represent the charged analyte.

== History ==
Koichi Tanaka performed the first successful LDI experiments on proteins. Subsequently, Sunner and Chen used graphite particles of 2-150 μm in size as a substrate and solutions of analytes in glycerol to analyze low molecular weight analytes, peptides, and small proteins by surface-assisted laser desorption/ionization MS (SALDI-MS). The technique was soon picked up by the Siuzdak lab who used nanostructured silicon surface for analyses. Subsequent work on nanostructures included the addition of fluorinated "initiator" molecules onto the porous surface to enhance desorption/ionization, mass range, surface robustness, and sensitivity. Other surface-based SALDI-MS approaches have also developed, including in 2000 where a thin layer of activated carbon particles fixed on aluminum support Since the original 1999 nanostructured silicon experiments, the research has largely focused on introducing novel nanomaterials as substrates, to enhance the sensitivity, broaden the mass range and expand the categories of samples that can be analyzed using this technique.

SALDI was introduced as a promising method with potential applications in systems biology, particularly metabolomics. The introduction of nanomaterials as SALDI substrates attracted researchers in analytical chemistry. Such materials include carbon nanotubes (CNTs), metallic nanoparticles like Ag, Pt, Au, and nanostructured surfaces. This development of substrates allowed for further development of SALDI.

The development of desorption/ionization on silicon (DIOS)-MS in particular, and subsequently nanostructure-initiator mass spectrometry (NIMS) and nano-assisted laser desorption/ionization (NALDI), has also attracted the attention of analytical scientists. These methods have since become a benchmark for semiconductor-based SALDI research.

== Basic principles ==
The main principle of SALDI relies on a medium that absorbs energy from a laser and then transfers the energy to the target sample. This class of techniques where the bulk of energy goes to the substrate instead of the sample molecules is known as soft ionization techniques. The development of SALDI started as a modification of matrix-assisted laser desorption/ionization (MALDI). The former technique suffered from ionization interference from the matrix molecules of MALDI. SALDI substituted an active surface of specific substrates, usually made of inorganic components, for the organic matrix of MALDI.

SALDI is a three-stage process. The first stage is mainly concerned with mixing the samples with the substrate. In the second stage, the laser pulses are applied to the mix where the substrate absorbs the laser energy and transfers it to the sample molecules. In the final stage desorption and ionization occur and the potential difference accelerates produced ions into the mass analyzer.

=== Substrates ===
The substrate surface is playing a big role in adsorption, desorption, and ionization of the analyte molecules. This role is affected mainly by the chemical and physical properties of the substrate. Among these physical properties are the optical absorption coefficient, heat capacity and heat conductivity.

1) The optical absorption coefficient: as this increases the ability of the substrate to absorb and generate more heat when absorb energy increases.

2) The heat capacity: as this decreases, the same amount of heat induces a larger temperature increase.

3) The heat conductivity: as this decreases, the substrate is better able to maintain the high temperature; therefore, the adsorption, desorption and ionization of the analytes occur more rapidly and effectively.

There are three classes of nanomaterials that are utilized in SALDI-MS. Namely, the carbon-based, semiconductor-based and metallic-based.

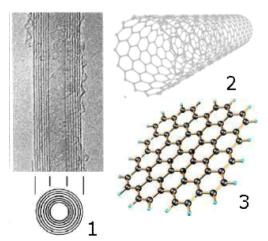
The forms of Carbon Nanotubes: Multiple or Single Wall Carbon Nanotube

==== Carbon nanotubes and carbon-based SALDI ====
The term carbon nanotube refers to a cylinder with a rolled graphene sheet. CNT can be single walled (SWNT) or multi-walled (MWNT). The SWNTs are perfect simulators of an ideal blackbody in the electromagnetic radiation ranging from the UV to far infrared. They exhibit better performance than former materials like super black, (a chemically etched nickel-phosphorus alloy). This makes the CNT's a desired material for laser mass spectrometry applications. That's why they attracted the researchers since discovery in the year 1991.

===== Graphene as a surface material =====
Graphene is a type of popular carbon nanomaterial discovered in 2004. It has a large surface area that could effectively attach the analyte molecules. On the other hand, the efficiency of desorption/ionization for analytes on a layer of graphene can be enhanced by its simple monolayer structure and unique electronic properties. Polar compounds including amino acids, polyamines, anticancer drugs, and nucleosides can be successfully analyzed. In addition, nonpolar molecules can be analyzed with high resolution and sensitivity due to the hydrophobic nature of graphene itself. Compared with a conventional matrix, graphene exhibits a high desorption/ionization efficiency for nonpolar compounds. The graphene substrate functions as a substrate to trap analytes and it transfers energy to the analytes upon laser irradiation, which allows for the analytes to be readily desorbed/ionized and the interference of matrix to be eliminated. It has been demonstrated that the use of graphene as a substrate material avoids the fragmentation of analytes and provides good reproducibility and a high salt tolerance.

==== Nanostructured semiconductor-based SALDI ====
===== Porous silicon as a substrate material =====
Porous silicon acted as an effective substrate for SALDI, its porous structure helped in trapping the analytes and its unique optical activity transferred effectively the laser energy to the adsorbate. It was effective for analyzing wide range of biological small molecules. recently, a new technique named nanostructure Imaging mass spectrometry (NIMS) was introduced as a result of using explosive vaporization for desorption.

The mechanism for porous silicon surface as a SALDI substrate involves three steps:

1)Adsorption: the analyte is adsorbed by porous silicon through Hydrogen bond formation using the silanol groups.

2) Electronic excitation:laser pulse excite the silicon producing free electrons and positive charges in the surface layer.this increase the acidity of silanol groups which donate the proton easily to analytes.

3) Thermal Activation: analytes are activated thermally and dissociated from the surface.

== Instrumentation ==
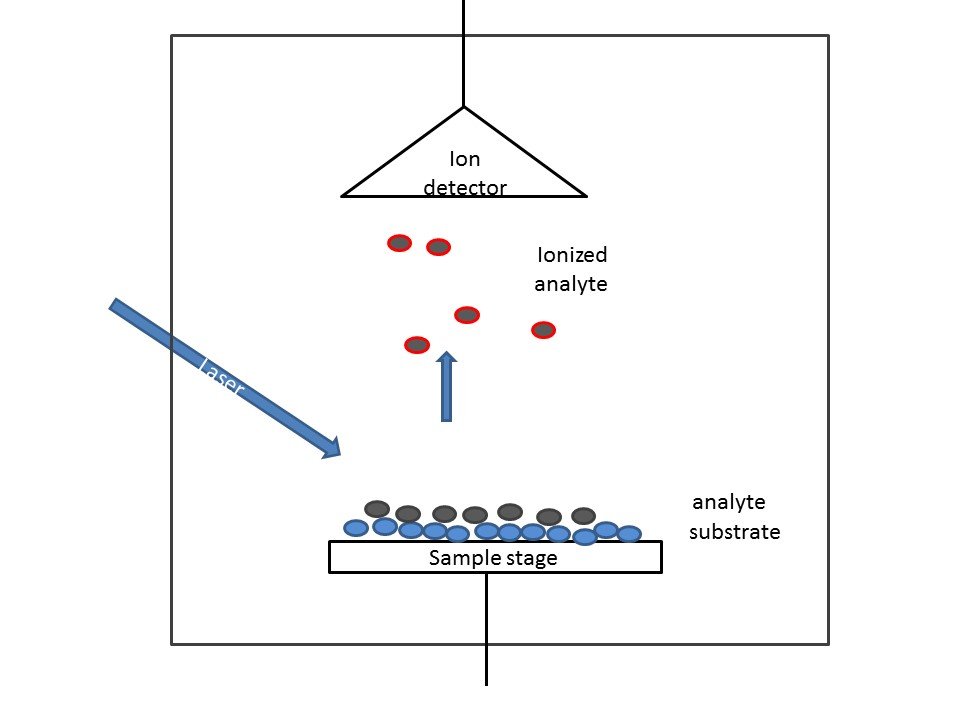
Schematic illustration of SALDI instrument

SALDI as an improvement of MALDI, used the very similar instrument to that of MALDI. It employs a laser source for pulsed laser generation which is responsible for excitation of the sample mixture, which consists of the analyte and substrate materials. On the other side of the instrument, the mass analyzer which separates the analytes according to their mass-to-charge ratio (m/z) and the detector are located. Analytes are accelerated to the analyzer by applying potential difference.

=== Combination with GC ===
Analytes were introduced from gas chromatography (GC) instrument which was coupled to the SALDI-MS instead of analytes being adsorbed on a solid substrate and directly ionized by means of a pulsed laser. Coupling to GC increased the efficiency of ionization and sensitivity. This was introduced for the first time in 2009 by Sunner et al.

=== Ambient SALDI ===
Recently, researchers were able to analyze in ambient conditions as a result of the involvement of DART ion source into the SALDI-MS system.

== Applications ==
=== Forensics ===
Forensic investigation owes DIOS the favor of producing evidence in contraceptive polymers in an alleged sexual assault case that could've never been made by any other analytical technique. Moreover, Pihlainen K. et al. reported that the technique showed great promise in the forensic analysis of illicit drugs. They also reported that the interference was diminished by using this technique.

In addition, another report stated that DIOS identified 11 impurities. Profiling the impurities was expected to lead to their origin. Eight years later, the authors published another report and mentioned that the technique identified the catecholamines in a human peripheral blood lymphocyte extract. Also the quantitation of salicylate in human serum was proved using the DIOS-MS in negative ion mode.

=== Biomedical ===
Thomas et al. worked on a group of enzyme systems, were able to achieve monitoring and direct analysis of enzyme-catalyzed reaction by DIOS-MS. One famous result was the reaction of acetylcholineesterase (AChE) with acetylcholine producing choline. This approach gained more fame when showed the ability to detect the selectivity of different enzyme inhibitors. The study started with hyperzine A, tacrine, and 2,6-dimethoxyphenyl-N-butylcarbamate, which are all inhibitors of AChE. The Inhibitor constant (ki) value of each of the inhibitors was found to be an important factor of their inhibition potentials. DIOS-MS has another advantage over MALDI, it can detect additional information in the low-mass region of mass spectrum as it can detect peptide peaks, and also identify post-translation modifications. These capabilities have great applications in protein identification with more confidence.

=== Clinical diagnosis ===
The DIOS-MS technique was employed as a novel technique for patient diagnosis by examining the patients' plasma. The study focused on patients with polycystic ovarian syndrome (POS) by comparing the DIOS metabolic profiles generated with those of healthy subjects. The information obtained can be used to estimate disease progression and the effect of medical treatment.

=== Pharmaceutical ===
An interesting area for researchers is to mobilize or immobilize some target proteins. It's a requirement in drug development mechanisms as some proteins' binding partners are not discovered yet. This was achieved by Zou et al. by using the DIOS technique. They employed a Psi surface as a probe to immobilize a targeted protein.

Next, the test drugs with the trial binding partners were introduced and incubated the probe. The immobilized proteins were able to capture the drug molecules that had a high affinity for the targeted protein. The ones with low affinity were washed off. The next step was to identify the captured drug molecules, and this was done by the SALDI analysis. The process offers great selectivity in testing drug candidates; it filters out the weak candidates and picks the most effective ones. It's not limited to proteins, it can work with macro biological molecules like DNA and RNA.

Another famous test was done with hemoglobin. In this test, a hemoglobin-modified surface was employed. The target was to identify the non-covalent binding between hemoglobin and relevant chemicals. Among 13 different chemicals that included antimicrobials, insecticides, fungicides and herbicides, only triphenyltin chloride succeeded in binding hemoglobin strongly. This was a practical warning of the high toxicity of this material relative to other tested compounds.

=== Biochemical ===
==== Metabolic profiling ====
With increasing work and research in metabolomics, new techniques were needed for introducing novel study approaches. SALDI-MS and the family of direct analysis mass spectrometry (DAMS) were introduced as novel approaches in metabolomics. Goodacre et al. employed the DIOS-MS technique to study the yeast. They portrayed the yeast metabolites secreted by yeast showing that the metabolic "footprinting" of yeast is achievable. In a prior research work, the same group employed direct infusion mass spectrometry (DIMS) with electrospray ionization. They studied the metabolic profiles of a large number of wild types and mutants; and mathematical techniques were employed for data analysis to determine potential biomarkers.

==== Imaging mass spectrometry ====
SALDI has been employed for imaging of a mouse heart and brain tissues. This was the first achieved SALDI-MS. As in SALDI, laser has to penetrate through the tissue and be absorbed by the layer underneath, thickness would be a limiting factor, and researchers were able to overcome this factor by introducing an organic matrix onto the tissue section. This was named matrix enhanced surface-assisted laser desorption/ionization mass spectrometry (ME-SALDI-MS) to account for the different processes employed in the technique and refer to the modification that enhanced the technique.

More work was done for imaging of drug molecule distribution in brain tissue, then the cholesterol distribution in brain tissue and the sucrose distribution in Gerbera jamesonii flower stem. Also biofluids for direct analysis of drug molecules and their metabolites has been investigated.

== See also ==
Fast atom bombardment
