= Koichi Tanaka =

Japanese electrical engineer (born 1959)

- 田中 耕一
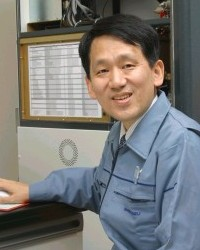
- Koizumi Cabinet E-mail Magazine, No.81, February 6, 2003.
- Born: 3 August 1959 (age 67); Toyama, Japan
- Education: Tohoku University
- Known for: Soft laser desorption
- Awards: Nobel Prize in Chemistry (2002); Order of Culture (2002); Person of Cultural Merit (2002); IEEE Milestone (2024)
- Scientific career
- Fields: Electrical Engineering, chemistry
- Workplaces: Shimadzu Corporation

Koichi Tanaka (田中 耕一, Tanaka Kōichi; born August 3, 1959) is a Japanese electrical engineer who shared the Nobel Prize in Chemistry in 2002 for developing a novel method for mass spectrometric analyses of biological macromolecules with John Bennett Fenn and Kurt Wüthrich (the latter for work in NMR spectroscopy).

== Early life and education ==
Tanaka was born and raised in Toyama, Japan, his biological mother died one month after he was born. Tanaka graduated from Tohoku University with a bachelor's degree in electrical engineering in 1983, afterward he joined Shimadzu Corporation, where he engaged in the development of mass spectrometers.

== Soft laser desorption ==
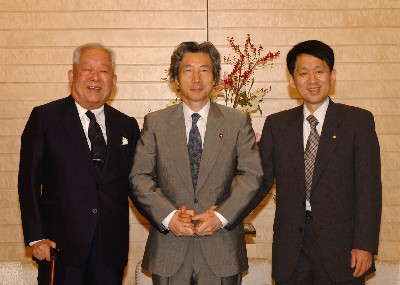
with Masatoshi Koshiba and Jun'ichirō Koizumi (at the Prime Minister's Official Residence on October 11, 2002)

For mass spectrometry analyses of a macromolecule, such as a protein, the analyte must be ionized and vaporized by laser irradiation. The problem is that the direct irradiation of an intense laser pulse on a macromolecule causes cleavage of the analyte into tiny fragments and the loss of its structure. In February 1985, Tanaka found that by using a mixture of ultra fine metal powder in glycerol as a matrix, an analyte can be ionized without losing its structure. His work was filed as a patent application in 1985, and after the patent application was made public reported at the Annual Conference of the Mass Spectrometry Society of Japan held in Kyoto, in May 1987 and became known as soft laser desorption (SLD).

The obscure Tanaka had been at the second-lowest rank at Shimadzu when he won the Nobel Prize. The embarrassed company immediately promoted Tanaka to research fellow, and named a laboratory after him. However, there was some criticism about his winning the prize, saying that contribution by two German scientists, Franz Hillenkamp and Michael Karas was also big enough not to be dismissed, and therefore they should also be included as prize winners. This is because they first reported in 1985 a method, with higher sensitivity using a small organic compound as a matrix, that they named matrix-assisted laser desorption/ionization (MALDI). Also Tanaka's SLD is not used currently for biomolecules analysis, meanwhile MALDI is widely used in mass spectrometry research laboratories. But while MALDI was developed prior to SLD, it was not used to ionize proteins until after Tanaka's report.

== Blood-based early disease detection ==
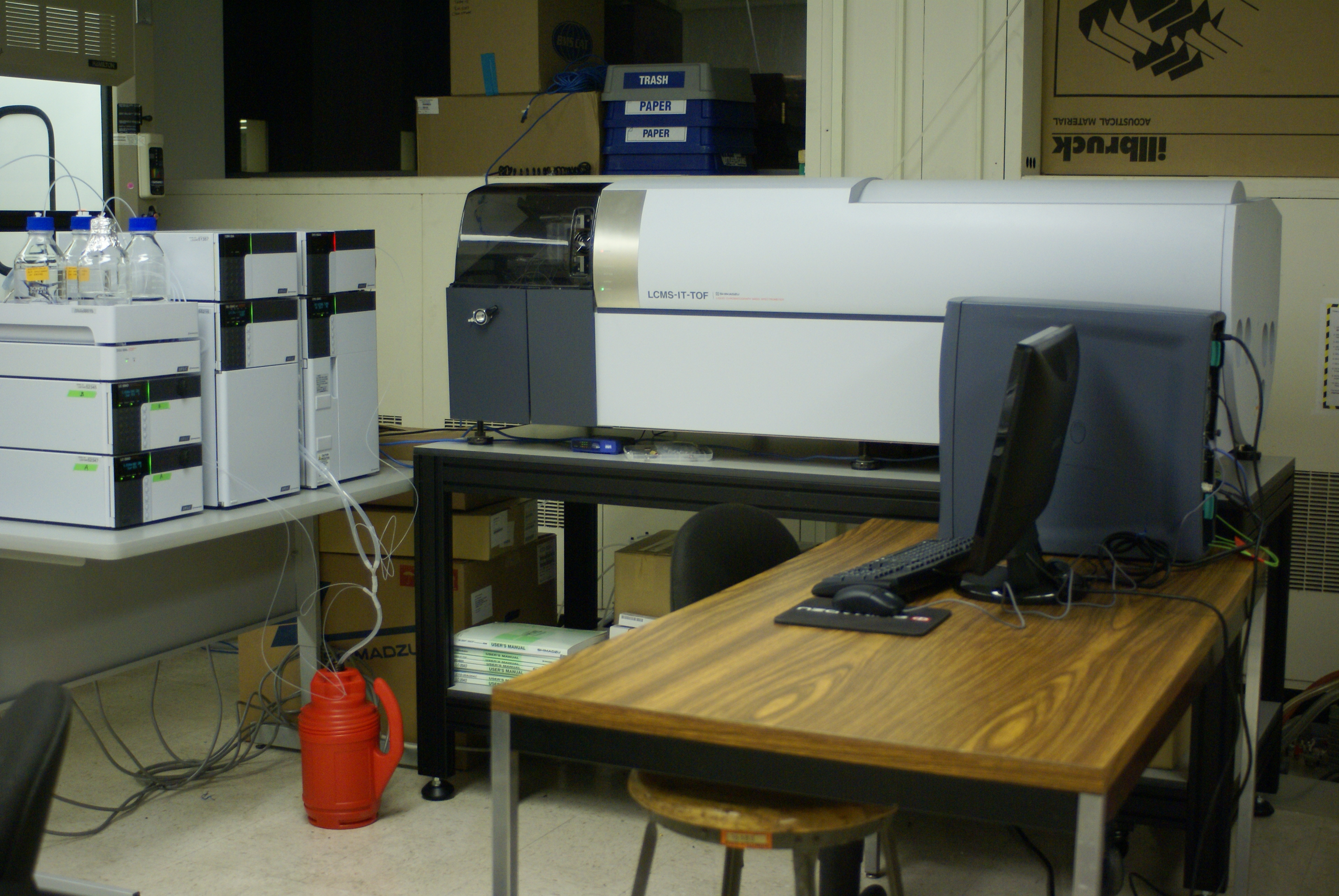
Shimadzu LCMS-IT-TOF liquid chromatography mass spectrometer, used in the development of next-generation diagnostic methods for detecting disease-related proteins from blood samples.

Tanaka Team have developed a diagnostic technology that enables early detection of diseases from a small amount of blood. By artificially modifying antibodies with polyethylene glycol at their base, the arms can move like springs, allowing simultaneous binding to antigens. In experiments with protein fragments related to Alzheimer's disease, the modified antibodies captured antigens more than 100 times more strongly than conventional antibodies. Later improvements enabled glycan analysis from trace mixed samples without peptide selection, leading to the detection of Alzheimer’s-related proteins from 1 mL of blood and the identification of eight previously unknown related substances. This technology is expected to contribute to the early detection of various diseases, including Alzheimer’s disease and prostate cancer.

The research originated from work awarded the Nobel Prize in 2002, though the initial methods lacked sufficient sensitivity for medical applications. In 2009, it was selected for the FIRST Program, Development of Next-Generation Mass Spectrometry Systems and Contributions to Drug Discovery and Diagnosis, which provided about 4 billion yen over five years. With a team of around 60 researchers, a breakthrough analytical method was developed within a year, achieving up to a 10,000-fold increase in sensitivity.

In November 2011, the team described the results as a technology applicable to early diagnosis and antibody-based drug development, publishing findings in the electronic edition of an English journal issued by the Japan Academy. On August 23, 2012, further results were published in the U.S. journal PLOS ONE in collaboration with Motoharu Seiki of the University of Tokyo Institute of Medical Science. By 2014, the technology had advanced to the stage of detecting Alzheimer’s-related substances directly from blood samples, and since April 2014, efforts under a new framework have been directed toward practical application.

== Recognition ==
- 1989 – Award of the Mass Spectrometry Society of Japan
- 2002 – Nobel Prize in Chemistry
- 2002 – Order of Culture
- 2002 – Person of Cultural Merit
- 2002 – Honorary doctorate from Tohoku University
- 2003 – Honorary citizenship of Toyama Prefecture
- 2003 – Special Award of the Mass Spectrometry Society of Japan
- 2006 – Member of Japan Academy
- 2024 – IEEE Milestone for "LAMS-50K" (one of the 5-member development team)

== See also ==
- History of mass spectrometry
- List of Japanese Nobel laureates
