= Soft laser desorption =

Soft laser desorption (SLD) is laser desorption of large molecules that results in ionization without fragmentation. "Soft" in the context of ion formation means forming ions without breaking chemical bonds. "Hard" ionization is the formation of ions with the breaking of bonds and the formation of fragment ions.

== Background ==
The term "soft laser desorption" has not been widely used by the mass spectrometry community, which in most cases uses matrix-assisted laser desorption/ionization (MALDI) to indicate soft laser desorption ionization that is aided by a separate matrix compound. The term soft laser desorption was used most notably by the Nobel Foundation in public information released in conjunction with the 2002 Nobel Prize in Chemistry. Koichi Tanaka was awarded 1/4 of the prize for his use of a mixture of cobalt nanoparticles and glycerol in what he called the “ultra fine metal plus liquid matrix method” of laser desorption ionization. With this approach, he was able to demonstrate the soft ionization of proteins. The MALDI technique was demonstrated (and the name coined) in 1985 by Michael Karas, Doris Bachmann, and Franz Hillenkamp, but ionization of proteins by MALDI was not reported until 1988, immediately after Tanaka's results were reported.

Some have argued that Karas and Hillenkamp were more deserving of the Nobel Prize than Tanaka because their crystalline matrix method is much more widely used than Tanaka's liquid matrix. Countering this argument is the fact that Tanaka was the first to use a 337 nm nitrogen laser while Karas and Hillenkamp were using a 266 nm Nd:YAG laser. The "modern" MALDI approach came into being several years after the first soft laser desorption of proteins was demonstrated.

The term soft laser desorption is now used to refer to MALDI as well as "matrix free" methods for laser desorption ionization with minimal fragmentation.

== Variants ==
=== Graphite ===
The surface-assisted laser desorption/ionization (SALDI) approach uses a liquid plus graphite particle matrix. A colloidal graphite matrix has been called "GALDI" for colloidal graphite-assisted laser desorption/ionization.

=== Nanostructured surfaces ===
The desorption ionization on silicon (DIOS) approach is laser desorption/ionization of a sample deposited on a porous silicon surface. Nanostructure-initiator mass spectrometry (NIMS) is a variant of DIOS that uses "initiator" molecules trapped in the nanostructures. Although nanostructures are typically formed by etching, laser etching can also be used, for example as in laser-induced silicon microcolumn arrays (LISMA) for matrix-free mass spectrometry analysis.

=== Nanowires ===
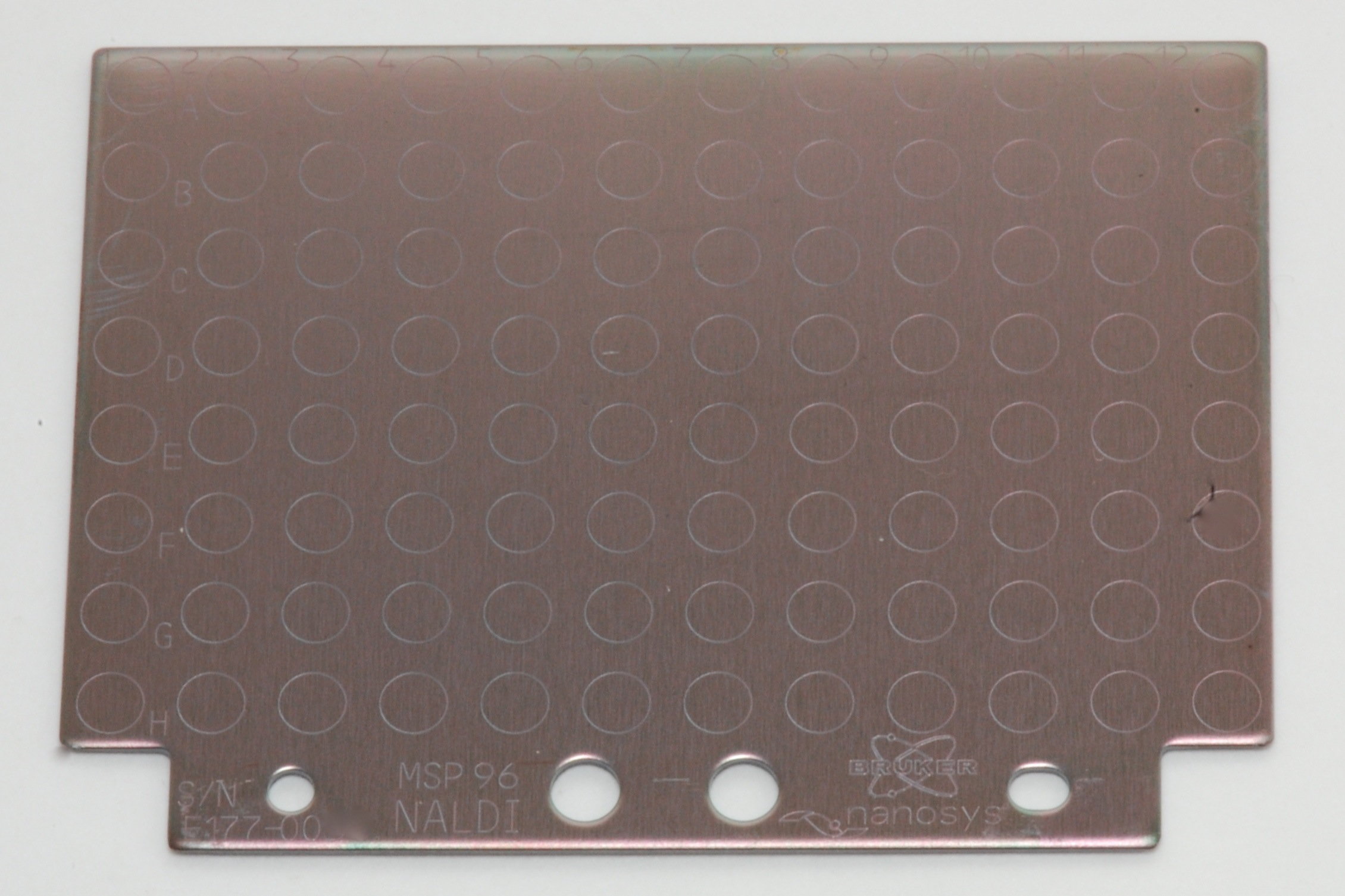
A commercial NALDI target

Silicon nanowires were initially developed as a DIOS-MS application. This approach was later commercialized as Nanowire-assisted laser desorption/ionization (NALDI) uses a target consisting of nanowires made from metal oxides or nitrides. NALDI targets are available from Bruker Daltonics (although they are marketed as "nanostructured" rather than "nanowire" targets).

=== Surface-enhanced laser desorption/ionization (SELDI) ===
The surface-enhanced laser desorption/ionization (SELDI) variant is similar to MALDI, but uses a biochemical affinity target. The technique known as surface-enhanced neat desorption (SEND) is a related variant of MALDI with the matrix is covalently linked to the target surface. The SELDI technology was commercialized by Ciphergen Biosystems in 1997 as the ProteinChip system. It is now produced and marketed by Bio-Rad Laboratories.

=== Other methods ===
The technique known as laser induced acoustic desorption (LIAD) is transmission geometry LDI with a metal film target.
