= Surface-enhanced laser desorption/ionization =

- Acronym: SELDI
- Analytes: Biomolecules

Other techniques
- Related: Matrix-assisted laser desorption/ionization Soft laser desorption Surface-assisted laser desorption/ionization

Surface-enhanced laser desorption/ionization (SELDI) is a soft ionization method in mass spectrometry (MS) used for the analysis of protein mixtures. It is a variation of matrix-assisted laser desorption/ionization (MALDI). In MALDI, the sample is mixed with a matrix material and applied to a metal plate before irradiation by a laser, whereas in SELDI, proteins of interest in a sample become bound to a surface before MS analysis. The sample surface is a key component in the purification, desorption, and ionization of the sample. SELDI is typically used with time-of-flight (TOF) mass spectrometers and is used to detect proteins in tissue samples, blood, urine, or other clinical samples, however, SELDI technology can potentially be used in any application by simply modifying the sample surface.

== Sample preparation and instrumentation ==
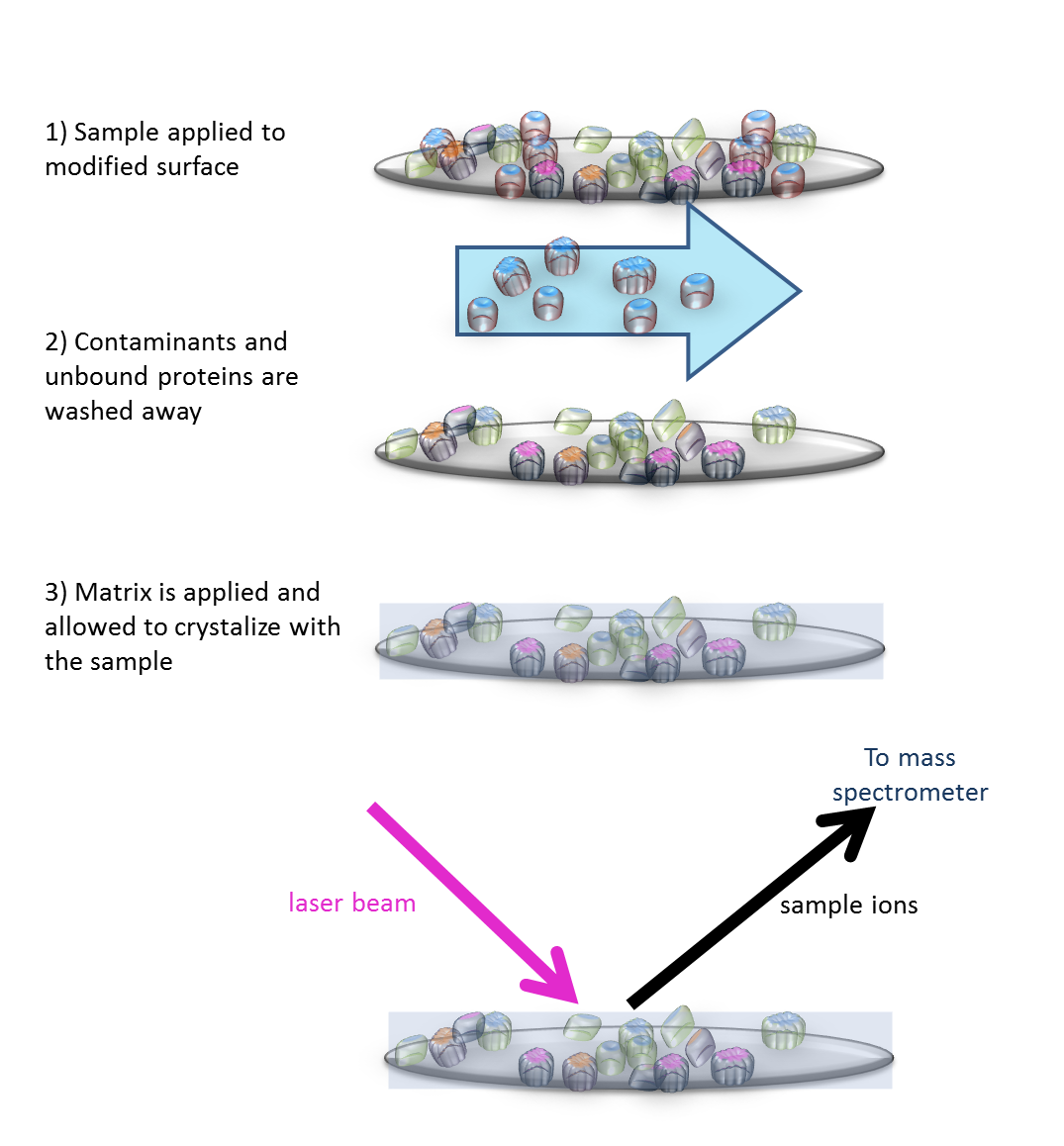
SELDI Mechanism

SELDI can be seen as a combination of solid-phase chromatography and TOF-MS. The sample is applied to a modified chip surface, which allows for the specific binding of proteins from the sample to the surface. Contaminants and unbound proteins are then washed away. After washing the sample, an energy absorbing matrix, such as sinapinic acid (SPA) or α-Cyano-4-hydroxycinnamic acid (CHCA), is applied to the surface and allowed to crystallize with the sample. Alternatively, the matrix can be attached to the sample surface by covalent modification or adsorption before the sample is applied. The sample is then irradiated by a pulsed laser, causing ablation and desorption of the sample and matrix.

=== SELDI-TOF-MS ===
Samples spotted on a SELDI surface are typically analyzed using time-of-flight mass spectrometry. An irradiating laser ionizes peptides from crystals of the sample/matrix mixture. The matrix absorbs the energy of the laser pulse, preventing destruction of the molecule, and transfers charge to the sample molecules, forming ions. The ions are then briefly accelerated through an electric potential and travel down a field-free flight tube where they are separated by their velocity differences. The mass-to-charge ratio of each ion can be determined from the length of the tube, the kinetic energy given to ions by the electric field, and the velocity of the ions in the tube. The velocity of the ions is inversely proportional to the square root of the mass-to-charge ratio of the ion; ions with low mass-to-charge ratios are detected earlier than ions with high mass-to-charge ratios.

=== SELDI surface ===
The binding of proteins to the SELDI surface acts as a solid-phase chromatographic separation step, and as a result, the proteins attached to the surface are easier to analyze. The surface is composed primarily of materials with a variety of physico-chemical characteristics, metal ions, or anion or cation exchangers. Common surfaces include CM10 (weak cation exchange), H50 (hydrophobic surface, similar to C_{6}-C_{12} reverse phase chromatography), IMAC30 (metal-binding surface), and Q10 (strong anion exchange). SELDI surfaces can also be modified to study DNA-protein binding, antibody-antigen assays, and receptor-ligand interactions.

=== Additional surface methods ===
The SELDI process is a combination of surface-enhanced neat desorption (SEND), surface-enhanced affinity-capture (SEAC), and surface-enhanced photolabile attachment and release (SEPAR) mass spectrometry. With SEND, analytes can be desorbed and ionized without adding a matrix; the matrix is incorporated into the sample surface. In SEAC, the sample surface is modified to bind the analyte of interest for analysis with laser desorption/ionization mass spectrometry (LDI-MS). SEPAR is a combination of SEND and SEAC; the modified sample surface also acts as an energy absorbing matrix for ionization.

== History ==
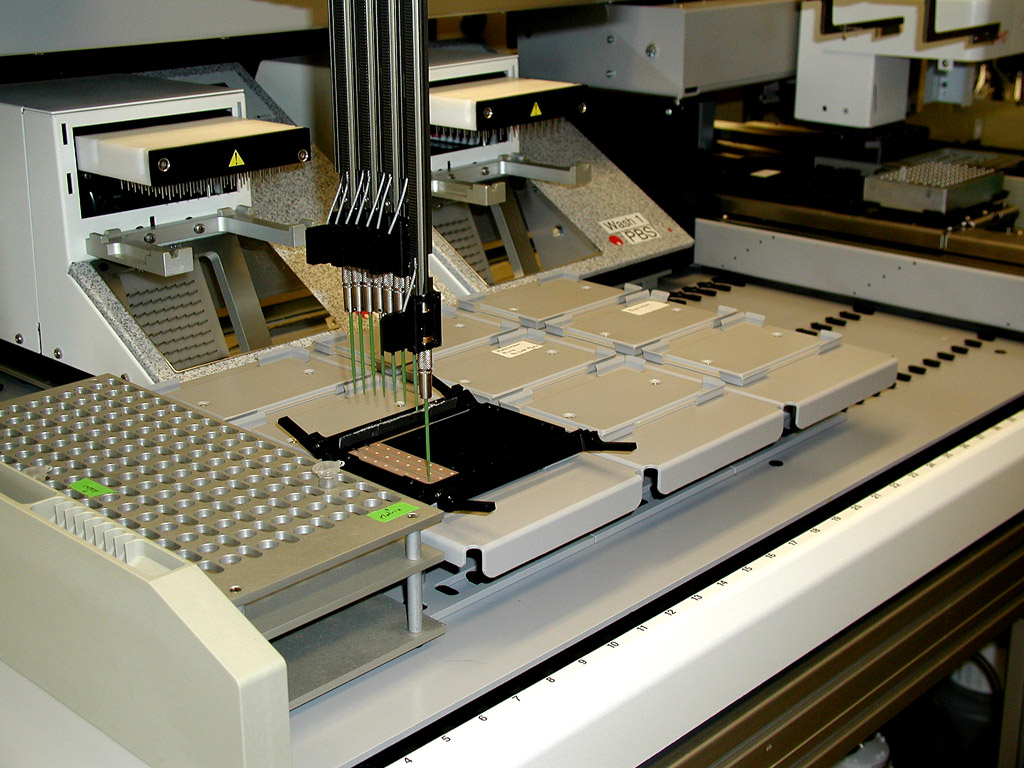
Genesis 2000 robot preparing Ciphergen SELDI-TOF protein chips for proteomic pattern analysis

SELDI technology was developed by T. William Hutchens and Tai-Tung Yip at Baylor College of Medicine in 1993. Hutchens and Yip attached single-stranded DNA to agarose beads and used the beads to capture lactoferrin, an iron-binding glycoprotein, from preterm infant urine. The beads were incubated in the sample and then removed, washed, and analyzed with a MALDI-MS probe tip. This research led to the idea that MALDI surfaces could be derivatized with SEAC devices; the technique was later described by Hutchens and Yip in 1998.

SELDI technology was first commercialized by Ciphergen Biosystems in 1997 as the ProteinChip system, and is now produced and marketed by Bio-Rad Laboratories.

== Applications ==
SELDI technology can potentially be used in any application by modifying the SELDI surface. SELDI-TOF-MS is optimal for analyzing low molecular weight proteins (<20 kDa) in a variety of biological materials, such as tissue samples, blood, urine, and serum. This technique is often used in combination with immunoblotting and immunohistochemistry as a diagnostic tool to aid in the detection of biomarkers for diseases, and has also been applied to the diagnosis of cancer and neurological disorders. SELDI-TOF-MS has been used in biomarker discovery for lung, breast, liver, colon, pancreatic, bladder, kidney, cervical, ovarian, and prostate cancers. SELDI technology is most widely used in biomarker discovery to compare protein levels in serum samples from healthy and diseased patients. Serum studies allow for a minimally invasive approach to disease monitoring in patients and are useful in the early detection and diagnosis of diseases and neurological disorders, such as amyotrophic lateral sclerosis (ALS) and Alzheimer's.

SELDI-TOF-MS can also be used in biological applications to detect post-translationally modified proteins and to study phosphorylation states of proteins.

== Advantages ==
A major advantage of the SELDI process is the chromatographic separation step. While liquid chromatography-mass spectrometry (LC-MS) is based on the elution of analytes in the separated sample, separation in SELDI is based on retention. Any sample components that interfere with analytical measurements, such as salts, detergents, and buffers, are washed away before analysis with mass spectrometry. Only the analytes that are bound to the surface are analyzed, reducing the overall complexity of the sample. As a result, there is an increased probability of detecting analytes that are present in lower concentrations. Because of the initial separation step, protein profiles can be obtained from samples of as few as 25-50 cells.

In biological applications, SELDI-TOF-MS has a major advantage in that the technique does not require the use of radioactive isotopes. Furthermore, an assay can be sampled at multiple time points during an experiment. Additionally, in proteomics, the biomarker discovery, identification, and validation steps can all be done on the SELDI surface.

== Limitations ==
SELDI is often criticized for its reproducibility due to differences in the mass spectra obtained when using different batches of chip surfaces. While the method has been successful with analyzing low molecular weight proteins, consistent results have not been obtained when analyzing high molecular weight proteins. There also exists a potential for sample bias, as nonspecific absorption matrices favor the binding of analytes with higher abundances in the sample at the expense of less abundant analytes. While SELDI-TOF-MS has detection limits in the femtomolar range, the baseline signal in the spectra varies and noise due to the matrix is maximal below 2000 Da, with Ciphergen Biosystems suggesting to ignore spectral peaks below 2000 Da.

== See also ==
- Soft laser desorption
- List of mass spectrometry software
