= HPV-1 =

HPV-1 may refer to:

- HyperVision HPV-1, an ultra-high speed video camera developed by Shimadzu Corp.
- a human papillomavirus responsible for the common wart
