= John B. Fenn =

American chemist (1917–2010)

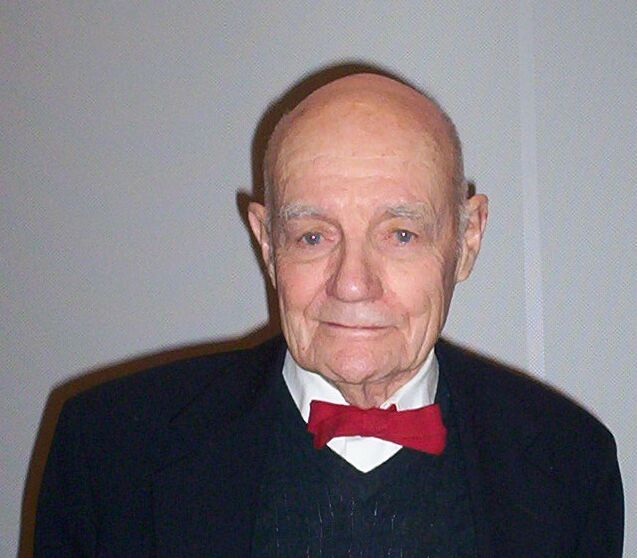
- Fenn in 2005
- Born: John Bennett Fenn; June 15, 1917; New York City, U.S.
- Died: December 10, 2010 (aged 93); Richmond, Virginia, U.S.
- Education: Berea College (AB); Yale University (PhD)
- Known for: Electrospray ionization
- Awards: Humboldt Prize (1982); Thomson Medal (2000); ABRF Award (2002); Nobel Prize in Chemistry (2002); Wilbur Cross Medal (2003)
- Scientific career
- Fields: Chemistry
- Workplaces: Princeton University; Yale University; Virginia Commonwealth University
- Thesis: The thermodynamics of hydrochloric acid in methanol-water mixtures (1940)

John Bennett Fenn (June 15, 1917 – December 10, 2010) was an American analytical chemist who was awarded a share of the Nobel Prize in Chemistry in 2002, sharing half of the award with Koichi Tanaka for their work in mass spectrometry (the other half went to Kurt Wüthrich). His contributions related to the development of electrospray ionization, now a commonly used technique for large molecules and routine liquid chromatography-tandem mass spectrometry. Early in his career, he studied the field of jet propulsion at Project SQUID and focused on molecular beams. He finished his career with more than 100 publications, including one book.

Fenn was born in New York City, and moved to Kentucky with his family during the Great Depression. Fenn did his undergraduate work at Berea College, and received his PhD from Yale. He worked in industry at Monsanto and at private research labs before moving to academic posts including Yale and Virginia Commonwealth University.

Fenn's research into electrospray ionization found him at the center of a legal dispute with Yale University. He lost the lawsuit, after it was determined that he misled the university about the potential usefulness of the technology. Yale was awarded $500,000 in legal fees and $545,000 in damages. The decision pleased the university, but provoked mixed responses from some people affiliated with the institution, who were disappointed with the treatment of a Nobel Prize winner with such a long history at the school.

== Early life and education ==
Fenn was born on June 15, 1917, in New York City, and grew up in Hackensack, New Jersey. In the years preceding the Great Depression, Fenn's father worked several different jobs, including briefly working as a draftsman at the Fokker Aircraft Company. During this time, Charles Lindbergh's plane The Spirit of St. Louis was briefly stored at one of the company's hangars. Fenn recalled sitting in the cockpit as a ten-year-old, pretending to pilot the famous plane. When his family's fortunes took a turn for the worse with the advent of the Depression, they moved to Berea, Kentucky, because his aunt Helen Dingman, who was on the faculty of Berea College, agreed to help the family. Fenn completed his education at Berea College and Allied Schools, formally finishing his high school education at the age of 15, but he took extra classes for another year rather than start college at such a young age. He earned his bachelor's degree from Berea College in his new hometown, with the assistance of summer classes in organic chemistry at the University of Iowa, and physical chemistry at Purdue.

When Fenn was considering graduate school, he was advised to take additional mathematics courses by Henry Bent, then a chemistry professor at Harvard University. His undergraduate program in chemistry had required minimal math courses, and he had been excused from these due to high marks in his high school courses. Due to Bent's advice, Fenn added math classes to his schedule. Despite his future success, Fenn always felt that his lack of mathematical skills were a hindrance in his career. After submitting several applications, Fenn received offers for teaching assistantships from Yale and Northwestern, and accepted the position at Yale. Fenn did his graduate studies in physical chemistry under Gosta Akerlof. He obtained his PhD in chemistry from Yale in 1940 and his thesis was 45 pages long, with only three pages of prose.

== Research career and academic posts ==
After completing graduate school, Fenn's first job was with Monsanto, working in the Phosphate Division and producing polychlorinated biphenyls (PCBs). Fenn and his colleague James Mullen became disenchanted with the direction of work at Monsanto, and they resigned together in 1943. Fenn worked briefly at a small company named Sharples Chemicals that focused on the production of amyl chloride derivatives. In 1945, he joined Mullen at his new startup, Experiment, Inc, focusing on research and development. Fenn's first publication came in 1949 as a result of his work with Mullen. That this publication came ten years after he completed graduate school made Fenn somewhat of a rarity amongst academics.

In 1952, Fenn moved to Princeton University as Director of Project SQUID, a program to support research related to jet propulsion that was funded by the Office of Naval Research. During this period, Fenn started his work developing supersonic atomic and molecular beam sources, which are now widely used in chemical physics research. After working with Project SQUID, Fenn returned to Yale University in 1967. He held a joint appointment in the chemistry and engineering departments until 1987, conducting much of his research in Mason Laboratory. In 1987, Fenn had reached Yale's mandatory retirement age. He became a professor emeritus, entitling him to office space at the university, but costing him most of his laboratory space and research assistants.

After a dispute with Yale over his forced retirement and the rights to his invention of electrospray ionization, Fenn moved to Richmond, Virginia to join Virginia Commonwealth University's (VCU) department of chemistry as an analytical chemistry professor. VCU established an engineering department in the late 1990s, and Fenn held a joint professorship between the two departments until his death. Even in his 80s, Fenn enjoyed the opportunity to be in the lab doing research, saying, "I like to mingle and exchange with the young people. It gets me out from underfoot at home."

== Research interests ==
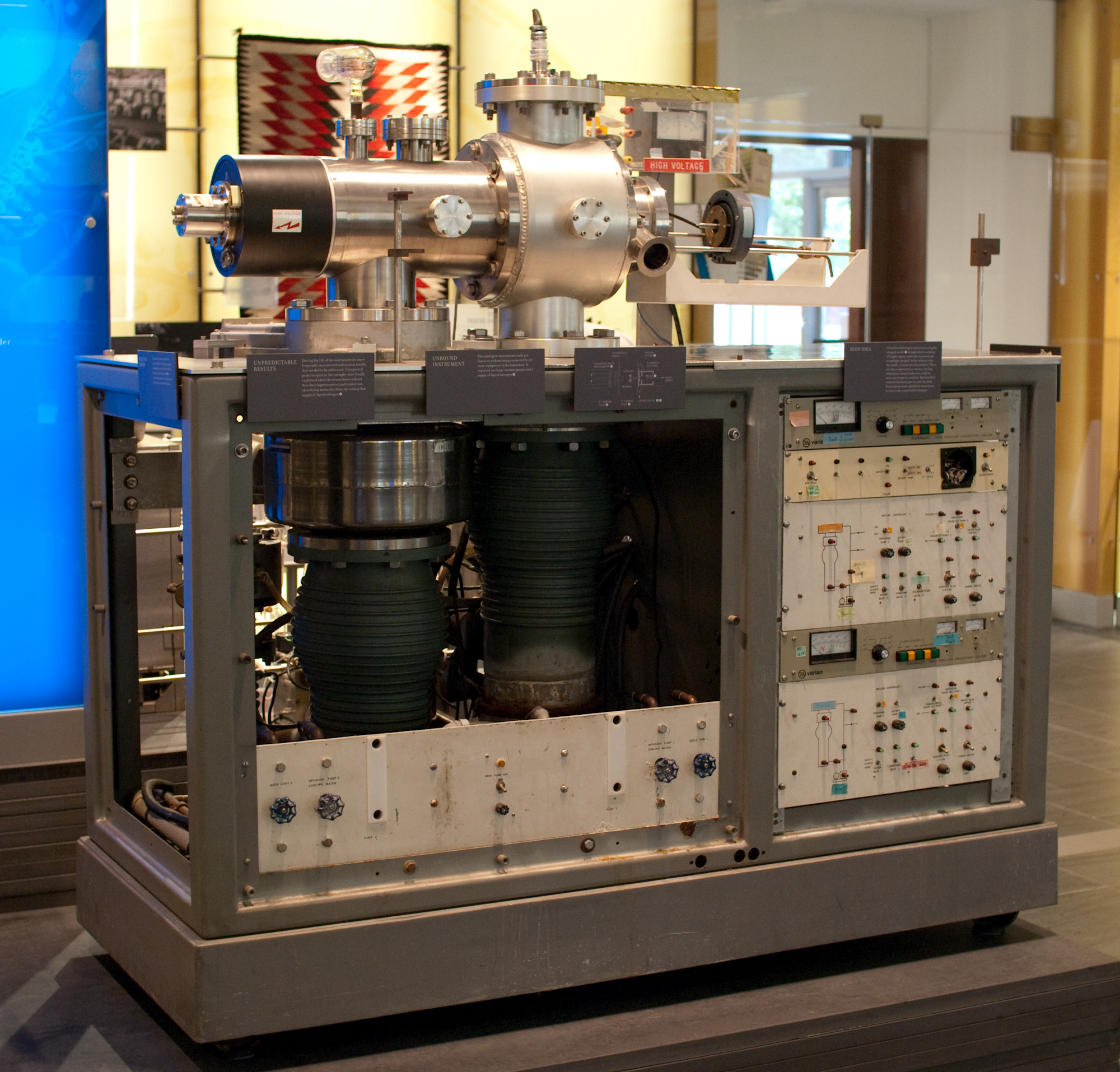
The instrument Fenn and his colleagues used to develop ESI is on display at the Science History Institute Museum in Philadelphia, PA

While Fenn was working with Monsanto, the company's research was focused on the production of phosphoric acid and polychlorinated biphenyls (PCBs). Fenn and his colleagues at Monsanto were largely unaware of the health hazards posed by PCBs, indeed because of their inertness, they "practically bathed in the stuff". After spending several more years doing various industrial research, Fenn was looking to get back into the academic world. He had the opportunity to go to Princeton University, where he became the director of Project SQUID.

Fenn did not start his Nobel-winning research until later in his career. He was semi-retired when he first published his research on electrospray ionization for mass spectrometry. Fenn felt that his work in electrospray ionization received "a kick in the pants" when proteomics emerged. In 2001, more than 1700 papers on proteomics were published, many using electrospray ionization. Electrospray ionization provides a way to get accurate information about the mass of a large molecule very quickly, even when it is in a mixture of other molecules. The liquid sample is introduced into an electrospray source (at atmospheric pressure) and desolvated with a flow of heated nitrogen gas. This forms small droplets which evaporate in a region under vacuum, which increases the charge on the droplets. For large molecules like proteins, this often results in multiply charge species. Increasing the charge on the molecules, decreased the mass-to-charge ratio, which allows the mass to be more easily determined.

Despite getting a late start in publishing his research (he did not publish a paper until 10 years after finishing graduate school), Fenn had over 100 publications at the time of his death. He also wrote a book, entitled Engines, Energy, and Entropy: A Thermodynamics Primer. The Science History Institute Museum in Philadelphia, PA has the instrument Fenn and his graduate students built while they were developing electrospray ionization on display, after receiving it as a gift from Fenn.

=== Lawsuit ===
Fenn's work with electrospray ionization was at the center of a lawsuit pitting him against his alma mater and former employer, Yale University. His initial dispute with the university began in 1987, when he turned 70 – Yale's mandatory retirement age. Per university policy, Fenn was made an emeritus professor, which resulted in a reduction to his lab space. Emeritus professors at Yale are still provided with an office, but cannot conduct their own research, nor manage their own labs. In 1989, when Yale University inquired about the progress and potential about his electrospray work, he downplayed its potential scientific and commercial value. Fenn believed he had the rights to the invention under the Bayh–Dole Act. Fenn patented the technology on his own, and sold licensing rights to a company he partly owned – Analytica of Branford. In 1993, a private company seeking to license the use of electrospray technology traced its invention to Yale, when the university discovered that Fenn held the patent. Yale's policy regarding patents generated by faculty or students requires that a percentage of any royalties generated from the patent are used by the university to fund future research. They do not claim the rights to patents that are produced away from university facilities or not related to the researcher's "designated activities." Fenn claimed that he owned the technology because the work was completed after he had been forced to downsize at the university's mandatory retirement age.

Yale University entered into its own licensing agreement with a private company, leading Fenn to file a lawsuit against the school in 1996. Yale countersued, requesting damages and reassignment of the patent. The two parties did not reach an out of court settlement, despite repeated attempts at mediation. In 2005, U.S. District Judge Christopher Droney ruled against Fenn, awarding Yale $545,000 in royalties and $500,000 in legal fees. Judge Droney was critical of Fenn, saying "Dr. Fenn only obtained the patent through fraud, civil theft, and breach of fiduciary duty." Evidence presented in the case indicated that Fenn had served on panels at Yale University that reviewed the institution's policy on intellectual property.

A spokesperson for Yale said, "We are pleased by the result in this case and, in particular, by the court's vindication of the Yale patent policy." The ruling, and Yale's response produced a mixed reaction from some of Fenn's colleagues and former students, who wrote a letter to the Yale Daily News stating, "'Vindicating the Yale patent policy' is a poor excuse for treating a Nobel Laureate with a 68-year association with and dedicated service to the University, in such a contemptible manner."

== Awards and honors ==
=== Nobel Prize ===
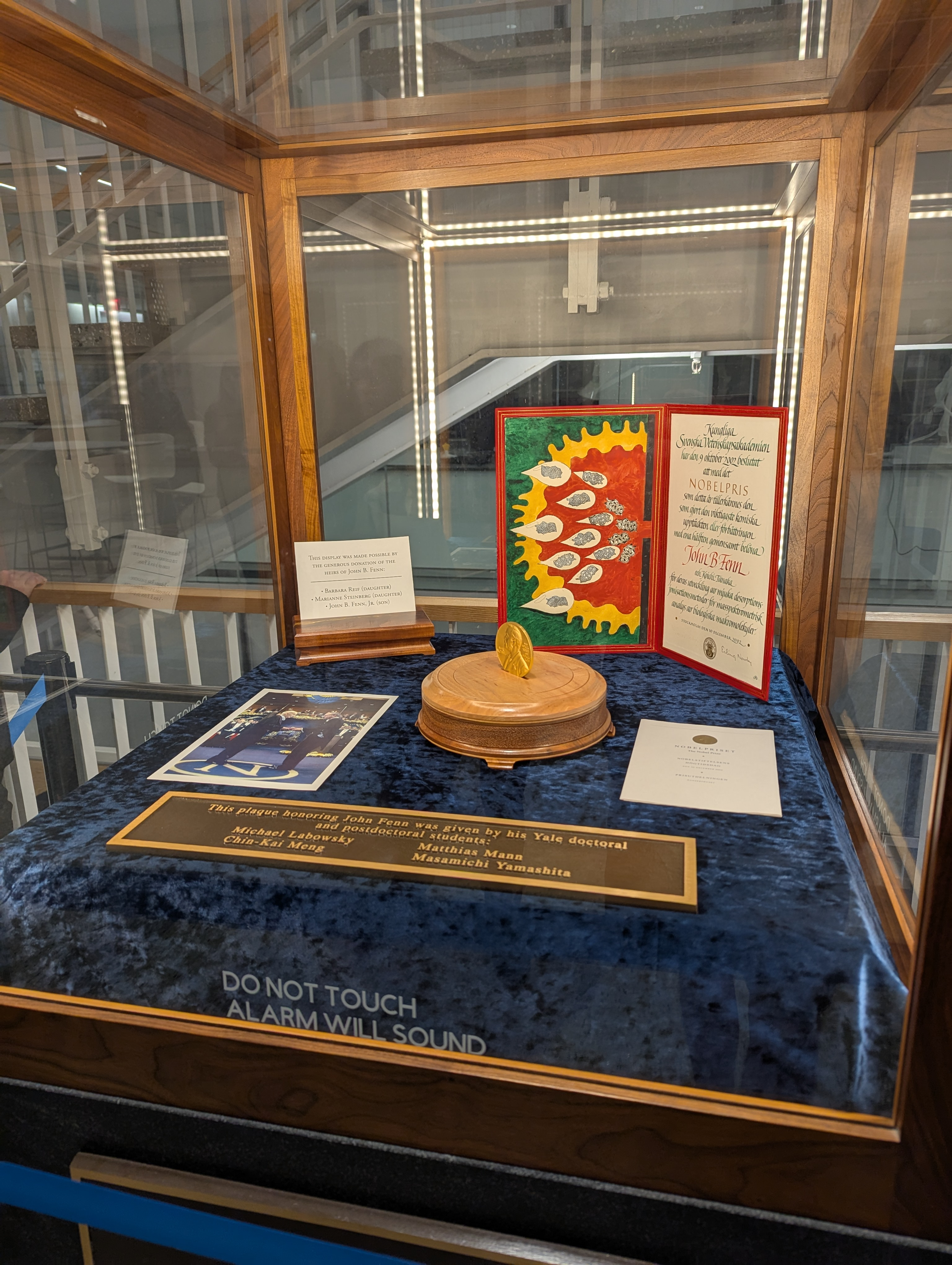
Honor of Fenn's Nobel Prize award in the Berea College in Berea, Kentucky

Fenn shared the 2002 Nobel Prize in Chemistry with Koichi Tanaka and Kurt Wüthrich "for the development of methods for identification and structure analyses of biological macromolecules." Fenn and Tanaka split half of the award for their work in developing ionization techniques for using mass spectrometry to analyze large biological molecules. Wüthrich was honored for his work in developing nuclear magnetic resonance techniques to analyze similar molecules in solution. Fenn was honored largely for his contributions to the development of electrospray ionization, which made the analysis of large molecules by mass spectrometry feasible. Fenn's Nobel lecture after being presented with the award was entitled "Electrospray Wings for Molecular Elephants." He was surprised by his selection as a Nobel winner, saying "It's like winning the lottery, I'm still in shock." At the time of his award, Fenn was working at Virginia Commonwealth University.

=== Priori Development and the ERIAD Controversy ===
John Fenn's development of electrospray ionization was preceded by the ERIAD method, a direct analogue created by Lidija Gall's group in the Soviet Union. Gall's team recorded mass spectra of peptides and proteins as early as 1981. During a 1983 visit to the Soviet Union, Fenn visited Lidija Gall's laboratory and engaged in "fruitful discussions" regarding her ERIAD method, which he described as "very promising". Although Gall published her findings in April 1984, which was five months before Fenn's first paper on the subject, her work remained largely unknown internationally for decades due to the "Iron Curtain". Despite this direct exposure to the technology and his comment that he would "try it in his lab," Fenn's subsequent 1984 publication did not cite Gall's earlier pioneering work. Gall's pioneering contributions were later recognized by the Nobel Committee in 2002 and through her receipt of the Thomson Medal in 2022.

=== Other awards ===
Fenn received his Nobel Prize fairly late in his career. Prior to being honored by the Nobel Foundation, Fenn had received numerous other awards. Early in his career, Fenn's research was focused on molecular beams, leading him to be named an honorary president of the Sixth International Symposium on Molecular Beams in 1977, and the first fellow of the International Molecular Beam Symposium in 1985. In 1982, the Alexander von Humboldt Foundation presented him with their U.S. Senior Scientist Award.

Fenn's work in mass spectrometry earned him another spate of awards later in his career. In 1992, the American Society for Mass Spectrometry presented him with their Award for Distinguished Contributions in Mass Spectrometry. The International Society of Mass Spectrometry honored him with the Thomson Medal in 2000, and in the same year the American Chemical Society presented him with the Award for Advancements in Chemical Instrumentation. He was awarded the Association of Biomolecular Resource Facilities Award for outstanding contributions to Biomolecular Technologies in 2002. In 2003, Fenn was honored by his alma mater with the Wilbur Cross Medal, the Yale Graduate School Alumni Association's highest honor.

Fenn maintained numerous professional affiliations, including membership in the American Chemical Society, the American Society for Mass Spectrometry, Sigma Chi, the American Association of University Professors and the Alexander von Humboldt Association of America. In 2000, Fenn was made a fellow of the American Academy of Arts and Sciences and in 2003 he was elected to the National Academy of Sciences.

== Personal life and death ==
Fenn married Margaret Wilson at the end of his second year of graduate studies. Together, they had three children – two daughters and a son. Margaret was killed in a car collision in New Zealand in 1992. Fenn remarried, his second wife was named Frederica Mullen.

Fenn died in Richmond, Virginia on December 10, 2010, at the age of 93, exactly eight years to the day after receiving his Nobel Prize. Fenn was survived by Frederica, his three children, seven grandchildren, and eleven great-grandchildren: Anika Fenn Gilman, Nora Fenn Gilman, Dominick Brown, Aaron Holloway, Michelle Holloway, Damarion Holloway, Tyrell Holloway, Eloise Whittington, JC Leslie, Manon Leslie, and Dino Steinberg.
