= Laser microprobe mass spectrometer =

A laser microprobe mass spectrometer (LMMS), also laser microprobe mass analyzer (LAMMA), laser ionization mass spectrometer (LIMS), or laser ionization mass analyzer (LIMA) is a mass spectrometer that uses a focused laser for microanalysis. It employs local ionization by a pulsed laser and subsequent mass analysis of the generated ions.

== Methods ==
In laser microprobe mass analysis, a highly focused laser beam is pulsed on a micro sample usually with a volume of approximately 1 microliter. The resulting ions generated by this laser are then analyzed with time-of-flight mass spectrometry to give composition, concentration, and in the case of organic molecules structural information.

Unlike other methods of microprobe analysis which involve ions or electrons, the LMMS microproble fires an ultraviolet pulse in order to create ions.

== Advantages ==
LMMS is relatively simple to operate compared to other methods. Furthermore, its strengths include its ability to analyze biological materials to detect certain compounds (such as metals or organic materials).

== Sample preparation ==
LAMMA is particular about the sample which is used. The sample must be small and thin. Ionization of too much material results in a large microplasma whose time spread and ion energy distribution entering the mass spectrometer can result in undesired peak deformation.

== See also ==
- Matrix-assisted laser desorption/ionization
- Franz Hillenkamp
