= Desorption/ionization on silicon =

Soft laser desorption method

Desorption/Ionization on Silicon
- Acronym: DIOS
- Classification: Mass spectrometry
- Analytes: Organic molecules Biomolecules; Polymers

Other techniques
- Related: MALDI; Soft laser desorption

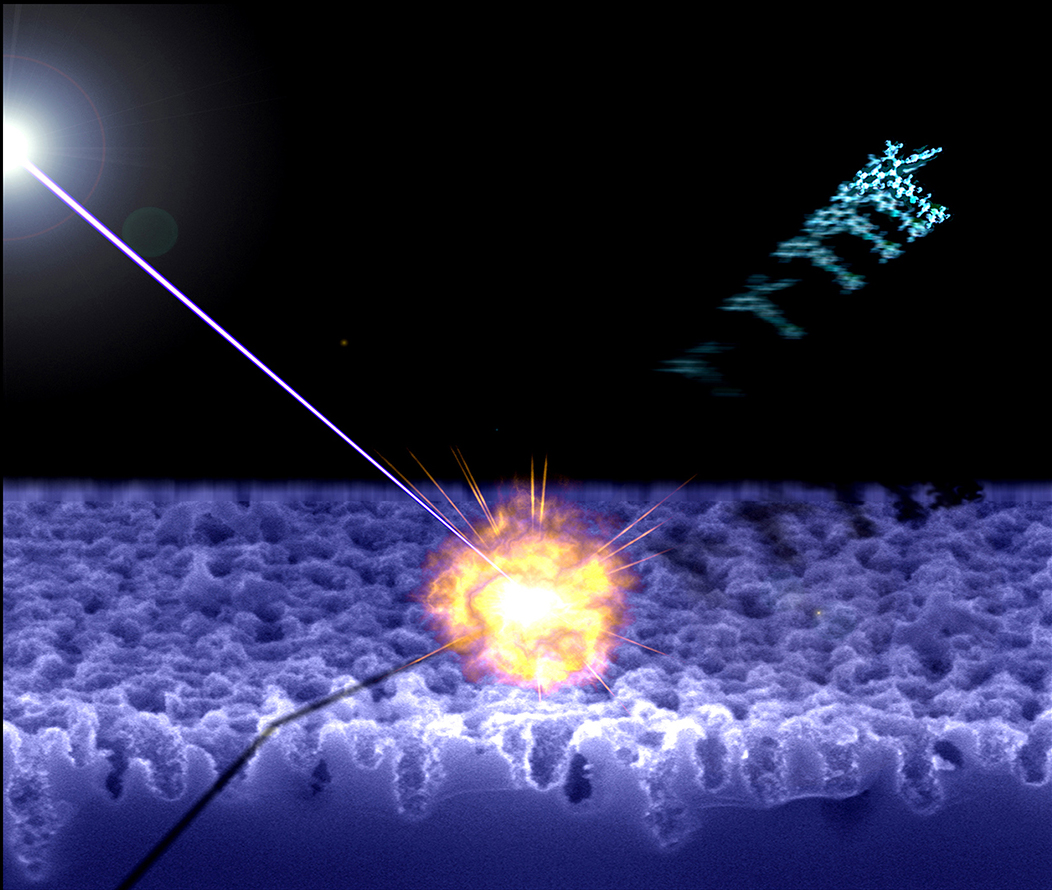
Laser-induced desorption/ionization on porous silicon (DIOS) mass spectrometry

Desorption/ionization on silicon (DIOS) is a soft laser desorption method used to generate gas-phase ions for mass spectrometry analysis. DIOS is considered the first surface-based surface-assisted laser desorption/ionization (SALDI-MS) approach. Prior approaches were accomplished using nanoparticles in a matrix of glycerol, while DIOS is a matrix-free technique in which a sample is deposited on a nanostructured (porous silicon) surface and the sample desorbed directly from the nanostructured surface through the adsorption of laser light energy. DIOS has been used to analyze organic molecules, metabolites, biomolecules and peptides, and, ultimately, to image tissues and cells.

== Background ==
Soft laser desorption is a soft ionization technique which desorbs and ionizes molecules from surfaces with minimal fragmentation. This is useful for a broad range of small and large molecules and molecules that fragment easily. The first soft laser desorption techniques included matrix-assisted laser desorption/ionization (MALDI) nanoparticles in glycerol. In MALDI, the analyte is first mixed with a matrix solution. The matrix absorbs energy from the laser pulse and transfers it to the analyte, causing desorption and ionization of the sample. MALDI generates [M+H]^{+} ions.

DIOS was first reported by Gary Siuzdak, Jing Wei and Jillian M. Buriak in 1999. It was developed as a matrix-free alternative to MALDI for smaller molecules. Because MALDI uses a matrix, background ions are introduced due to ionization of the matrix. These ions reduce the usefulness of MALDI for small molecules. In contrast, DIOS uses a porous silicon surface to trap the analyte. This surface is not ionized by the laser, therefore creating minimal background ionization and thus allowing for the analysis of small molecules.

== Applications ==
DIOS has been shown to be an ultra-sensitive means of generating and detecting molecules at the yoctomole level, both for DIOS nanostructured surfaces modified with fluorocarbons, and a subsequent related technology known as nanostructure-initiator mass spectrometry or nanostructure imaging mass spectrometry (NIMS).

DIOS has been shown to detect peptides, natural products, small organic molecules, and polymers with little fragmentation.

DIOS can be used for proteomics. It has been reported as a useful method protein identification. Because it is matrix free, it can be used to identify smaller biomolecules than MALDI. In addition, it can be used to monitor reactions on a single surface through repeated MS analyses. Reaction monitoring can be used to screen enzyme inhibitors.

Atmospheric pressure DIOS was shown to be an effective tool for quantitative analysis of drugs with high proton affinity.

The use of DIOS to image small molecules has been demonstrated. Lin He and coworkers imaged small molecules on mouse liver cells. They also used marker molecules to image HEK 293 cancer cells.
