= Project SQUID =

US Defence Effort

Project SQUID was a United States defense effort post-World War II effort to develop and improve pulsejet and rocket engines, run by the Office of Naval Research.

It was started by discovery of the German Argus As 014 pulsejet used on the V1 buzzbomb, which was reverse-engineered as the Republic Ford JB-2, the first American cruise missile. It produced extensive research in the areas of computational flow dynamics , and was used to improve the design of the experimental Fairchild XH-26 Jeep Jet, which used pulsejets on the rotor tips instead of a central engine. The research led to development of pulse detonation engines, which have been suggested as the engines powering the postulated Aurora spyplane.
