= Shimadzu =

Japanese laboratory instruments manufacturer

Shimadzu Corporation
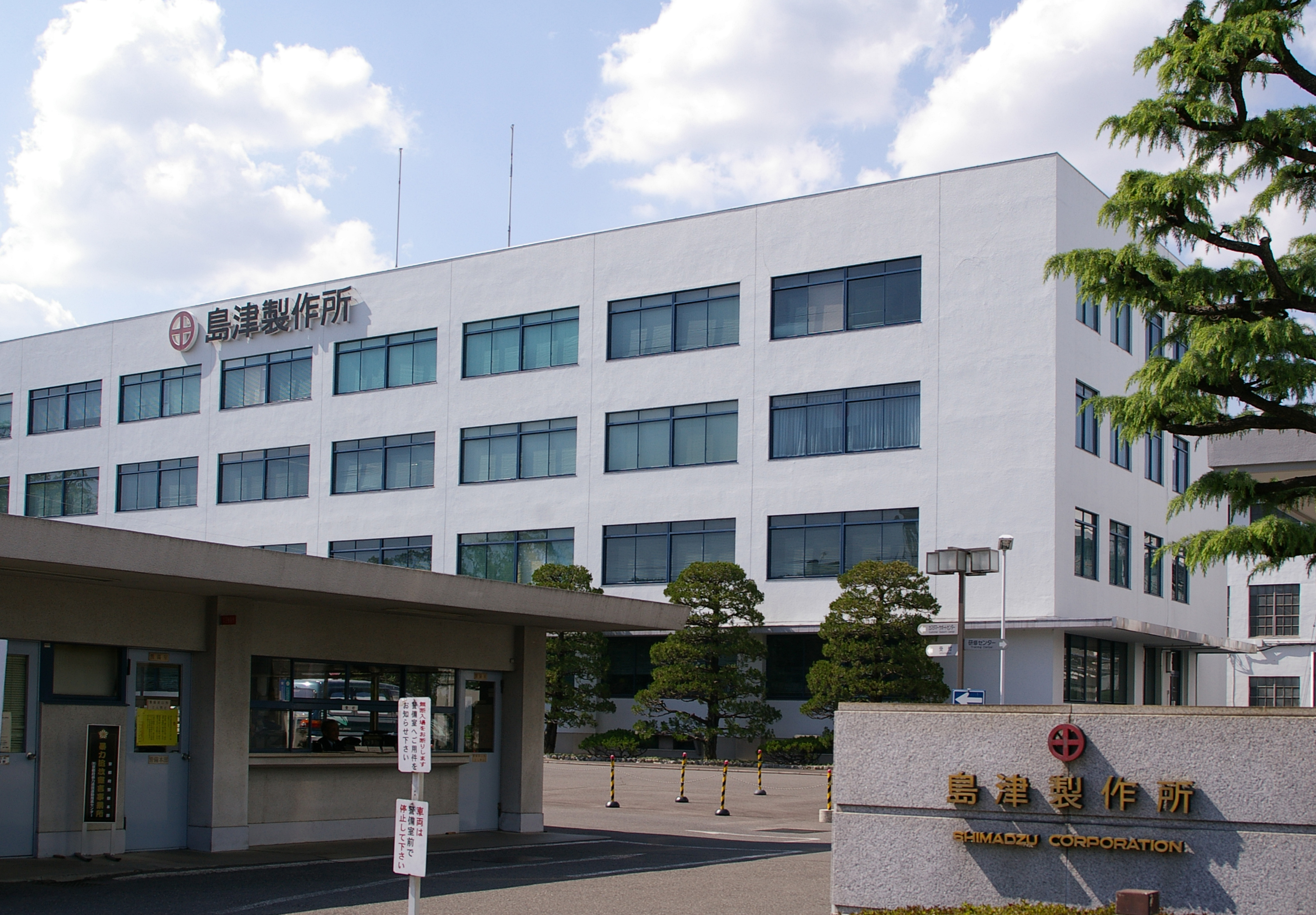
- Native name: 株式会社 島津製作所
- Type: Public KK
- Traded as: TYO: 7701; OSE: 7701
- Industry: Precision Instruments
- Founded: Kyoto, Japan (1875)
- Founder: Genzo Shimadzu
- Headquarters: 1, Nishinokyo-Kuwabara-cho, Nakagyo-ku, Kyoto 604-8511, Japan
- Area served: Worldwide
- Key people: Teruhisa Ueda, (President and Chief Executive Officer)
- Products: Scientific, medical, aircraft and industrial instruments
- Revenue: $ 3.5 billion (FY 2019) (¥ 385.4 billion) (FY 2019)
- Net income: $ 384.19 million (FY 2019) (¥ 41.8 billion) (FY 2019)
- Number of employees: 13,182 (as of March 31, 2020)
- Website: Official website

Shimadzu Corporation (株式会社 島津製作所, Kabushiki-gaisha Shimadzu Seisakusho) is a Japanese public KK company, manufacturing precision instruments, measuring instruments and medical equipment, based in Kyoto, Japan. It was established in 1875. The American arm of the company, Shimadzu Scientific Instruments, was founded in 1975.

== History ==
=== Founding and early years ===
The company was established by Genzo Shimadzu Sr. (島津 源蔵, Shimazu Genzō) in 1875. During the 1890s and 1900s, Shimadzu experienced rapid growth that occurred at the same time as higher education grew in Japan.

X-ray devices, the spectrum camera, the electron microscope, and the gas chromatograph were developed and commercialized in advance of other Japanese companies. Shimadzu became a corporation in 1917. The American arm of the company, Shimadzu Scientific Instruments, was founded in 1975.

Genzo Shimadzu Sr's son Genzo Shimadzu Jr was the second president of the company and also founded battery manufacturer GS (now GS Yuasa) in 1917.

=== Developments ===
The company also developed, in 2001, an ultra-high speed video camera, HyperVision HPV-1, which is capable of recording at 1,000,000 FPS, while in 2016 it released the HyperVision HPV-X2, a camera that achieves ultra-high-speed continuous recording at 10 million frames per second at Full Pixel Resolution. Other products developed by Shimadzu include head-mounted displays.

Koichi Tanaka won the 2002 Nobel Prize in Chemistry for a new mass spectrometry method. Embarrassed by Tanaka's low rank at the company, Shimadzu immediately promoted him to research fellow, and named a laboratory after him.

The company had revenue of ¥264.048 billion yen ($2.8 billion USD) in FY 2012, with 10,395 employees as of March 31, 2013.

== Acquisition history ==
In 2024, Shimadzu's scientific Instruments "SSI" acquired ZefSci (Zef Scientific, Inc.) to strengthen their core position in the Multi Vendor Space.

In 2019, Shimadzu's Medical subsidiary in USA acquired CORE Medical Imaging, Inc. to strengthen healthcare business in North America.

In 2018, Shimadzu acquired Infraserv Vakuumservice GmbH of Germany in order to strengthen their turbomolecular pump sales and service capabilities in Europe.

In 2017, Shimadzu acquired AlsaChim, a specialist for high-quality analytical isotope labeled standards.

In 1989, Shimadzu Corporation acquired Kratos Group Plc. in U.K. to expand in surface analysis and MALDI-TOF segments.

== Gallery ==
=== Products ===
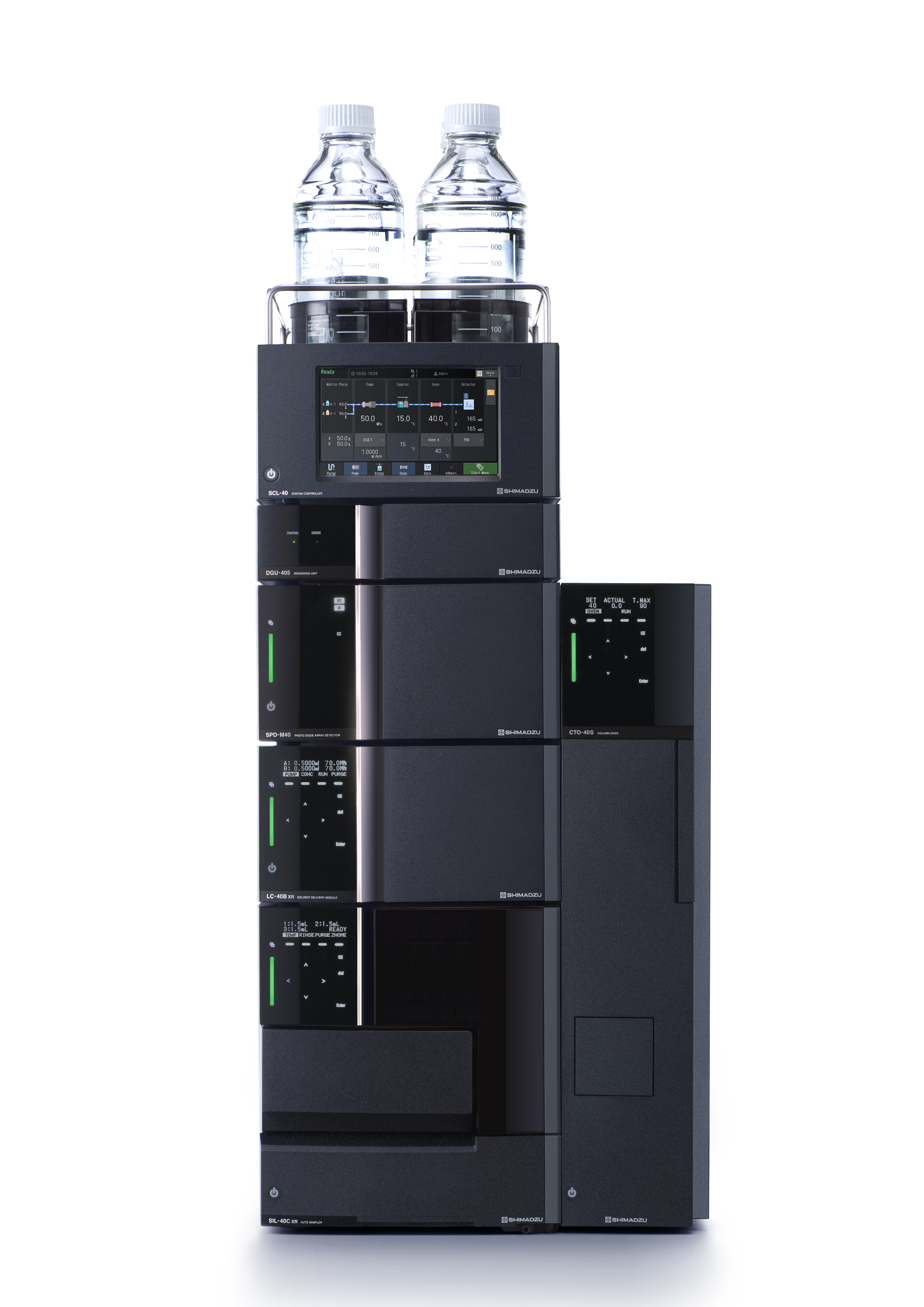
Shimadzu's Nexera series HPLC (2019)

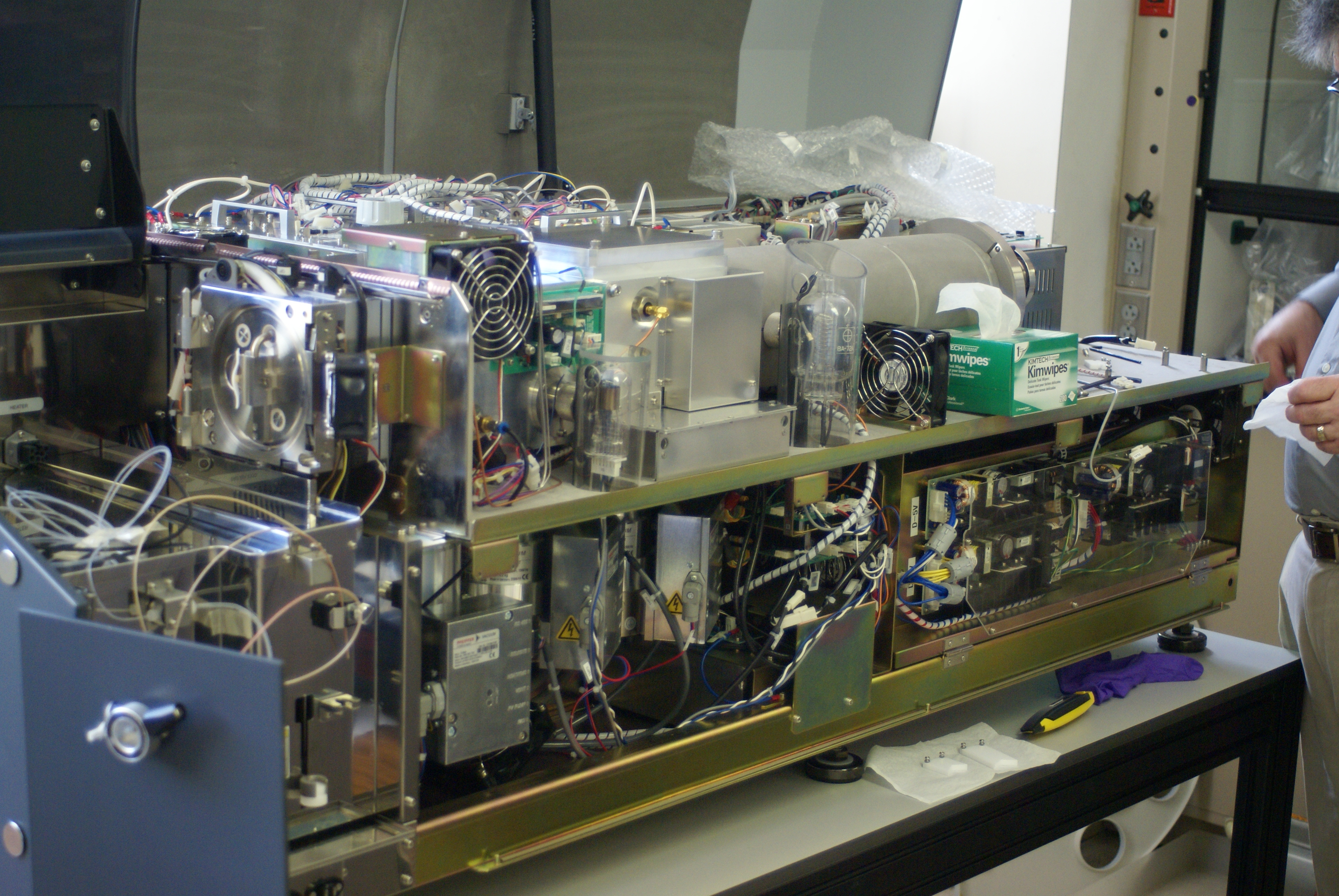
Inside the cover of a Shimadzu Ion Trap-Time of Flight mass spectrometer in 2008. Visible are power supplies, circuit boards, the flight tube, ion gauges etc.

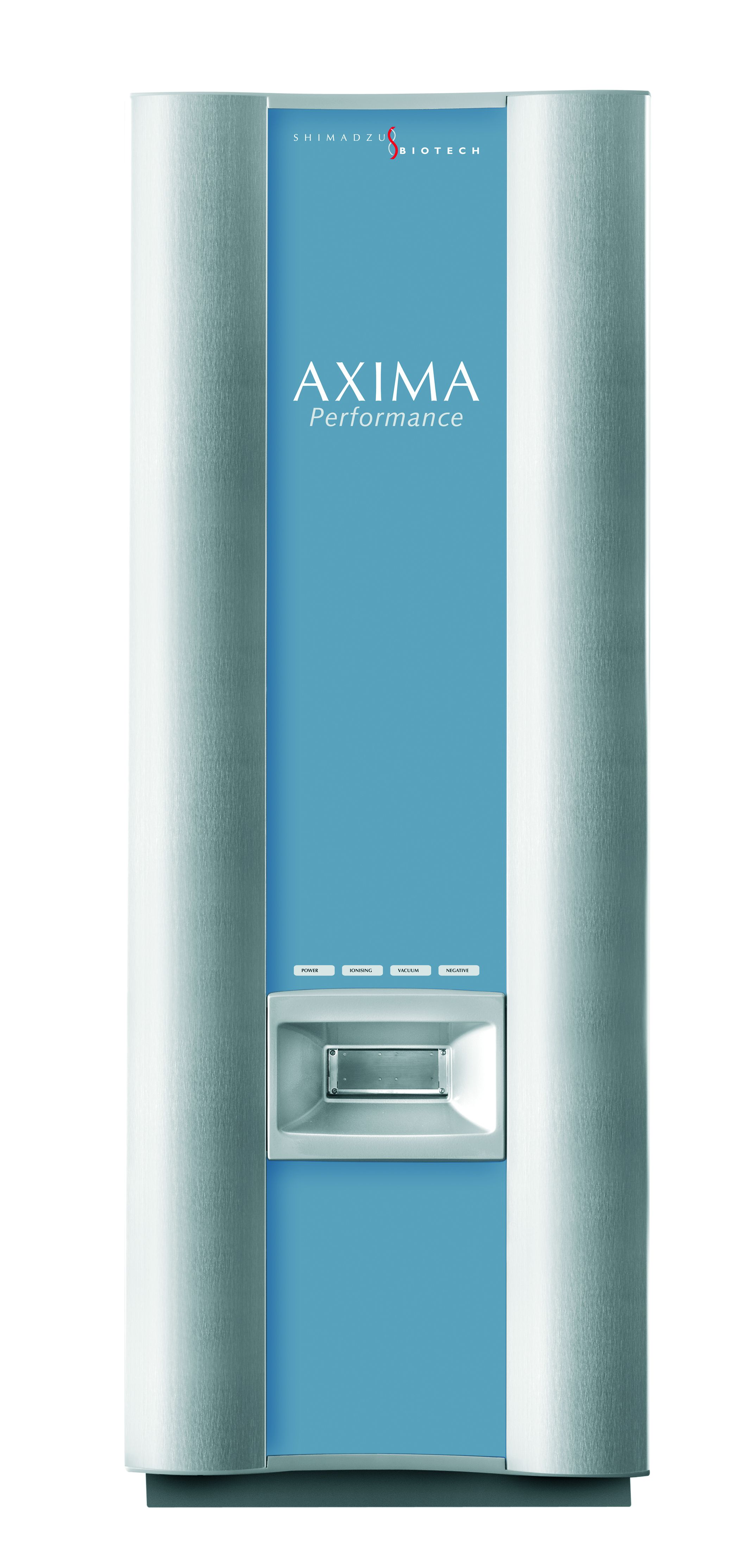
2009 MALDI mass spectrometer (in the Applications Lab of Shimadzu Scientific Instruments, Columbia, MD)

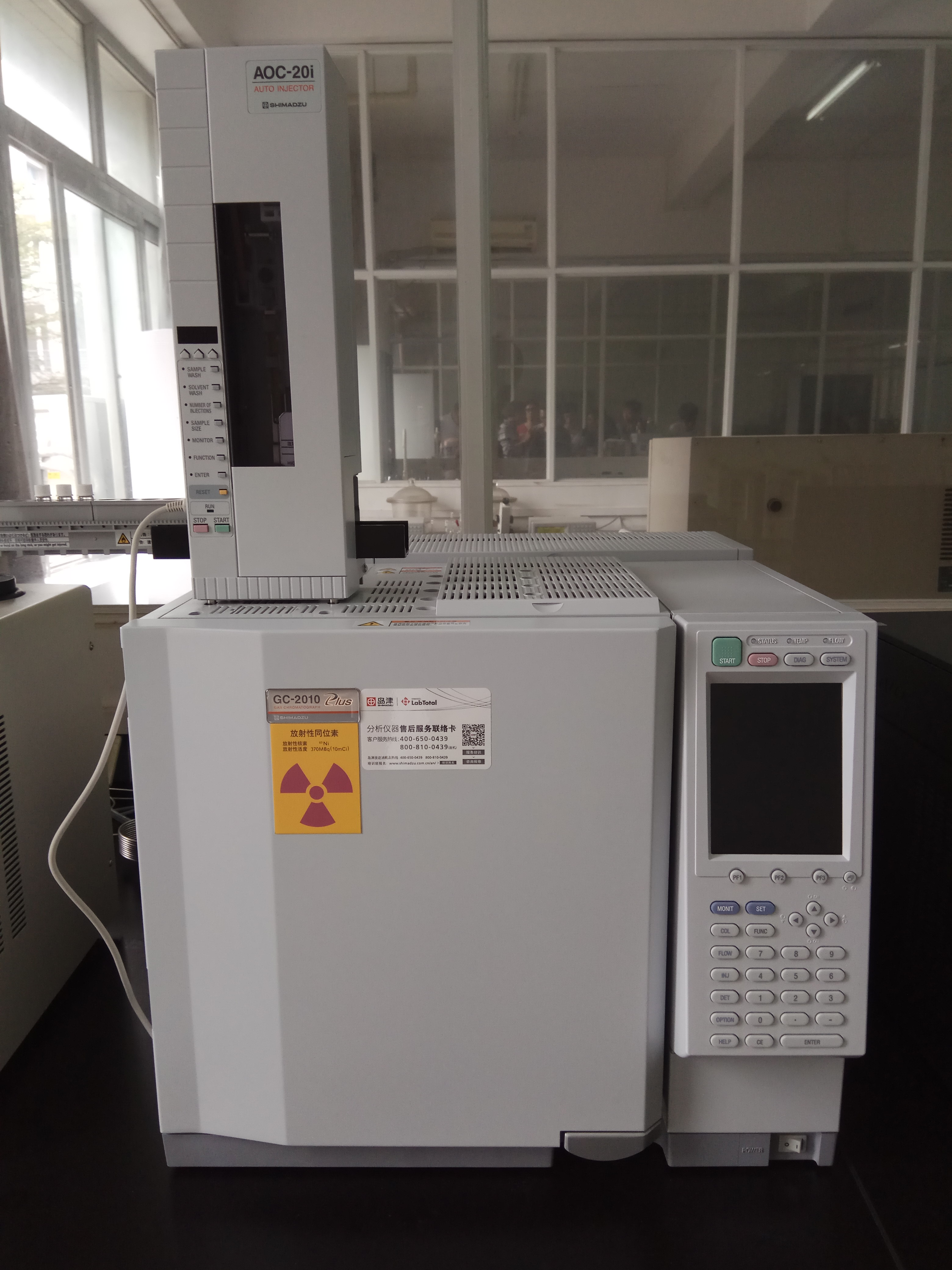
SHIMADZU GC-2010 Plus High-end Gas Chromatograph

=== Buildings ===
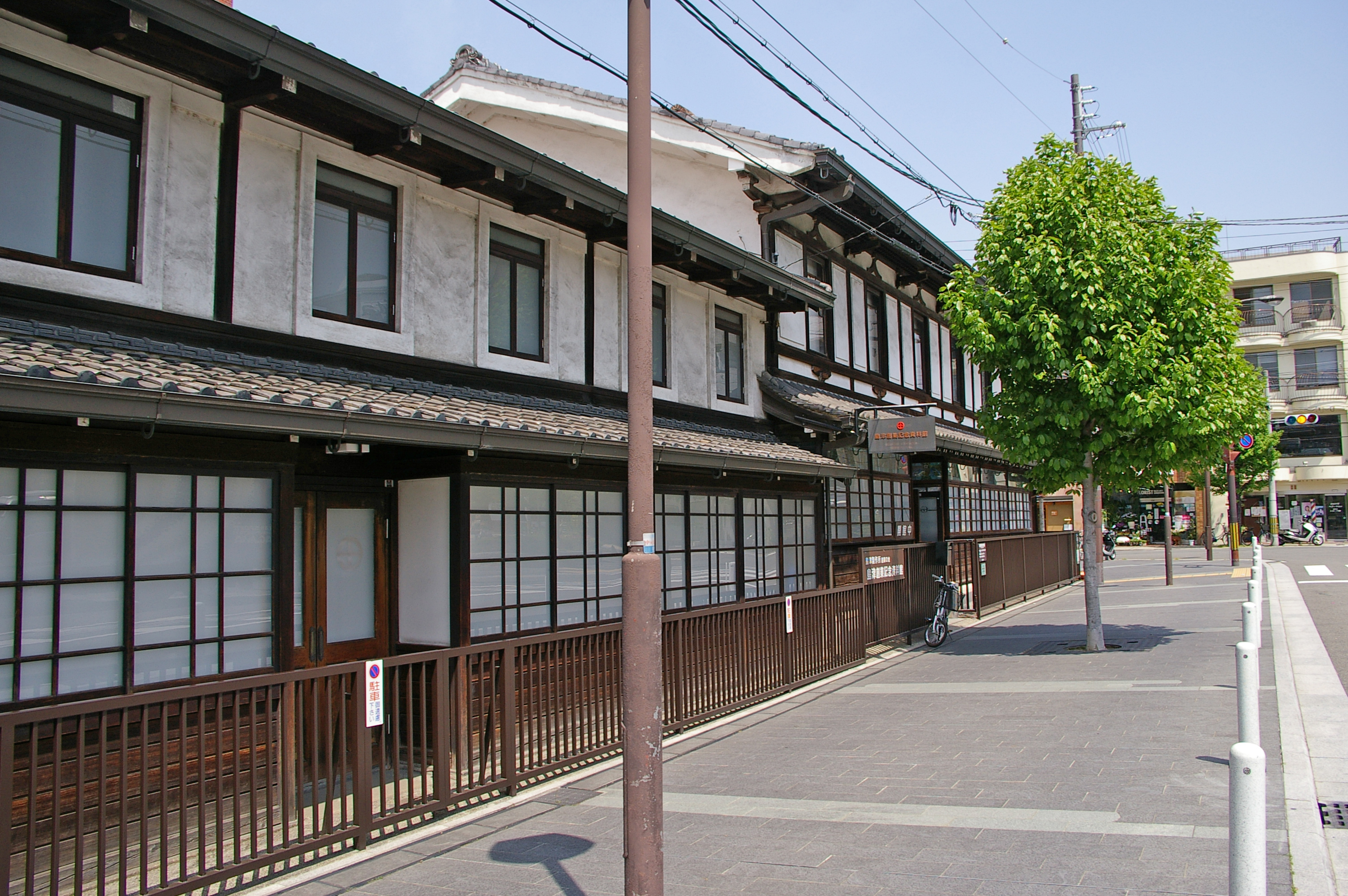
Shimadzu Foundation Memorial Hall in the Nakagyo-ku ward of Kyoto in 2006

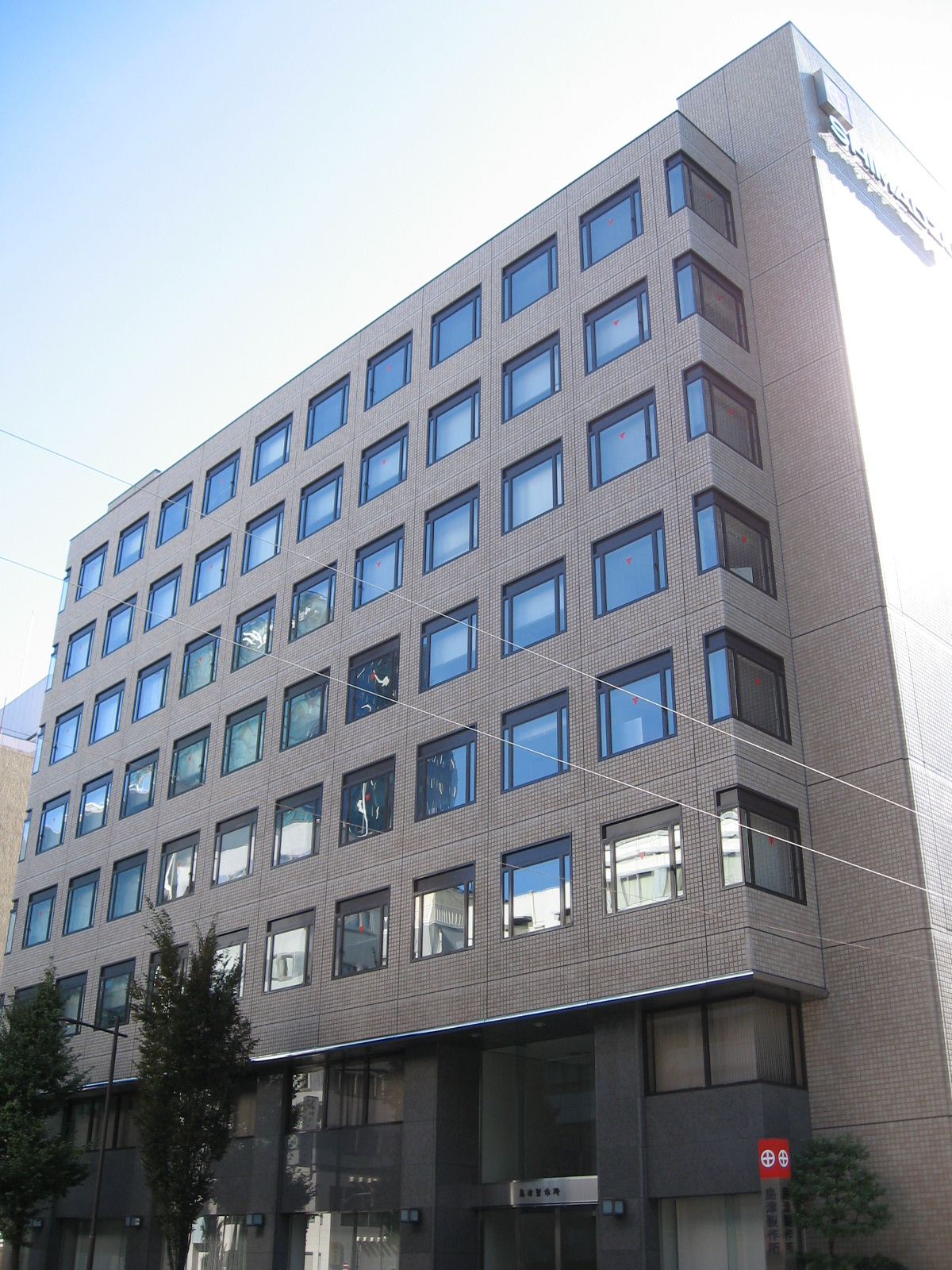
Shimadzu office building in Tokyo

== See also ==
- List of companies of Japan
- List of scientific instruments manufacturers
- Medical devices
- Laboratory equipment
- Mass spectrometry
