= Franz Hillenkamp =

German chemist (1936–2014)

- Born: March 18, 1936; Essen, Germany
- Died: August 22, 2014 (aged 78); Münster, Germany
- Known for: Laser microprobe mass analyzer Matrix-assisted laser desorption/ionization
- Awards: Distinguished Contribution in Mass Spectrometry (1997); Thomson Medal (2003); Karl Heinz Beckurts Award (2003)
- Scientific career
- Fields: Chemistry
- Workplaces: University of Münster

Franz Hillenkamp (March 18, 1936 – August 22, 2014) was a German scientist known for his development of the laser microprobe mass analyzer and, with Michael Karas, matrix-assisted laser desorption/ionization (MALDI).

== Early life and education ==
Franz Hillenkamp was born in 1936 in Essen, Germany. He attended high school in Lünen, graduating in 1955. He received an M.S. degree in electrical engineering from Purdue University in 1961. He received a Ph.D. (Dr.-Ing.) from the Technical University of Munich in 1966 with a thesis entitled “An Absolutely Calibrated Calorimeter for the Measurement of Pulsed Laser Radiation.”

== Academic career ==
Hillenkamp was a professor at Goethe University Frankfurt in Frankfurt from 1982 to 1986. In 1986, he became a professor on the Medical Faculty of the University of Münster where he remained until his retirement in 2001.

== Laser microprobe ==
In 1973, Hillenkamp developed a high performance laser microprobe mass spectrometer with a spatial resolution of 0.5 μm and sub-attogram limit of detection for lithium atoms. This instrument was commercialized as the LAMMA 500 and was one of the first laser desorption mass spectrometers to be used for mass spectrometry imaging of tissue. The later LAMMA 1000 was also based on a Hillenkamp design.

== MALDI ==
In 1985, Hillenkamp and his colleague Michael Karas used a LAMMA 1000 mass spectrometer to demonstrate the technique of matrix-assisted laser desorption/ionization (MALDI). MALDI is an ionization method used in mass spectrometry, allowing the analysis of large biopolymers. Although Karas and Hillenkamp were the first to discover MALDI, Japanese engineer Koichi Tanaka was the first to use a similar method in 1988 to ionize proteins and shared the Nobel Prize in Chemistry in 2002 for that work. Karas and Hillenkamp reported MALDI of proteins a few months later. The MALDI method of Karas and Hillenkamp subsequently became the much more widely used method.

== Awards ==
In 1997, Hillenkamp and Karas were awarded the American Society for Mass Spectrometry Distinguished Contribution in Mass Spectrometry award for their discovery of MALDI. Hillenkamp and Karas received the Karl Heinz Beckurts Award, Germany's most important award for outstanding promotion of the partnership between science and industry, in 2003. Hillenkamp received the Thomson Medal from the International Mass Spectrometry Foundation in 2003.

SPIE, the international society for optics and photonics created a postdoctoral fellowship in honor of Franz Hillenkamp. The SPIE-Franz Hillenkamp Postdoctoral Fellowship in Problem-Driven Biomedical Optics and Analytics offers an annual grant of US $75,000. This fellowship aims to facilitate the translation of cutting-edge biomedical optics and biophotonics technologies into practical applications within clinical settings, ultimately contributing to advancements in human healthcare.

== See also ==
- History of mass spectrometry
