= Michael Karas =

German physical chemist (born 1952)

- Born: 1952 (age 73–74); Germany
- Education: University of Bonn
- Known for: matrix-assisted laser desorption/ionization
- Scientific career
- Fields: Chemistry
- Workplaces: Goethe University Frankfurt; University of Münster
- Doctoral advisor: Franz Hillenkamp

Michael Karas (born 1952) is a German physical chemistry scientist and Professor, known for his researches on matrix-assisted laser desorption/ionization (MALDI), a technique in mass spectrometry.

Michael Karas studied chemistry at the University of Bonn, where he obtained a PhD in the field of physical chemistry in 1982. From 1983 to 1986, he was part of the Hillenkamp research group in the Institut für Biophysik at Goethe University Frankfurt. In 1987, he followed Hillenkamp at Münster and both formed a group in the Faculty of Medicine at University of Münster. He returned to Frankfurt in 1995 as a full professor for Instrumental Analytical Chemistry.

== Awards ==
- 1997: Recipient of the John B. Fenn Award for a Distinguished Contribution in Mass Spectrometry
- 2003: Karl Heinz Beckurts Award, Germany's most important award for outstanding promotion of the partnership between science and industry
- 2006: Thomson Medal awarded by the International Mass Spectrometry Foundation

== See also ==
- History of mass spectrometry
