= Direct electron ionization liquid chromatography–mass spectrometry interface =

Analytical chemistry technique

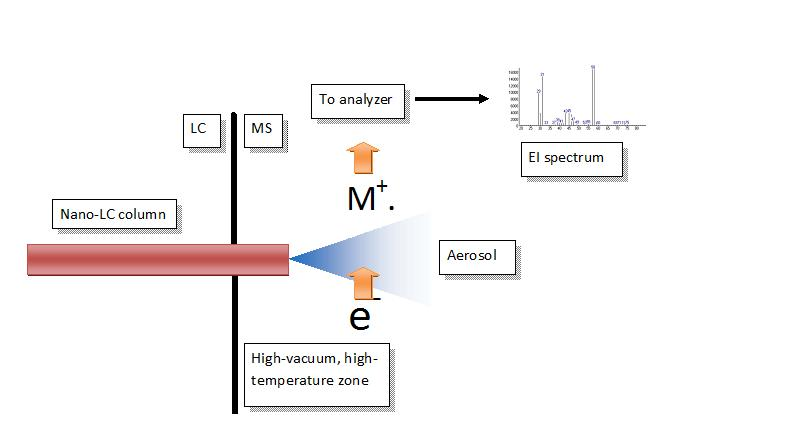
Scheme of a Direct-EI, LC-MS interface.

A direct electron ionization liquid chromatography–mass spectrometry interface (Direct-EI LC-MS interface) is a technique for coupling liquid chromatography and mass spectrometry (LC-MS) based on the direct introduction of the liquid effluent into an electron ionization (EI) source. Library searchable mass spectra are generated. Gas-phase EI has many applications for the detection of HPLC amenable compounds showing minimal adverse matrix effects. The direct-EI LC-MS interface provides access to well-characterized electron ionization data for a variety of LC applications and readily interpretable spectra from electronic libraries for environmental, food safety, pharmaceutical, biomedical, and other applications.

== Background ==
High performance liquid chromatography (HPLC) and electron ionization mass spectrometry (EIMS) are two analytical techniques that, in principle, seem to be incompatible. However, because these two approaches share a great deal of applications in the analysis of suitable molecules, typically less than 1000 u, a large effort has been devoted by the scientific community to develop a reliable, easy-to-use, and flawless interface. The first successful and commercially available device to combine EI and HPLC was designed by Willoughby and Browner in 1984. It was based on the conversion of the solute into a beam of particles, after the formation of spray droplets and the elimination of the solvent vapors through a multi-stage momentum separator. Although its efficient interfacing mechanism and a unique trait, particle beam performance was sometimes inadequate to an increasing number of new, demanding applications and was quickly replaced by a family of atmospheric pressure ionization-based interfaces (API) when they became commercially available. However, the possibility to record an EI spectrum from an HPLC application remained a challenge for a long time. The first Direct-EI prototype was first presented in 2002 and proposed an innovative approach that improved interfacing performance compared to that of particle beam and opened new opportunities for LC-MS applications.

== Mechanism ==
The interfacing mechanism is contained inside a common EI source, like that found in any GC-MS system. The liquid phase from a nano HPLC column is admitted from the capillary column port, where the connection tubing and the nebulizer are first introduced and sealed to prevent vacuum loss. The mechanism is based on the formation of an aerosol in high-vacuum conditions, followed by a quick droplet desolvation and final vaporization of the solute prior to the ionization. The completion of the process is quick and complete and reduces chances of thermal decomposition as reported in the Figure, where a scheme of the interface is shown. The core of the interface is represented by the micro-nebulizer. The nebulizer tip protrudes into the ion source so that the spray expansion is completely contained inside the ion volume. The eluate emerges as liquid phase at a flow rate of 300-500 nL/min, and any premature in-tube solvent evaporation is prevented by a convenient thermal insulation of the nebulizer and the connecting tubing from the surrounding source heat. The high temperature of the ion source, between 300 and 400°C, has a double function: to compensate for the latent heat of vaporization during the droplet desolvation, and to convert the solute into the gas phase. If all components of this simple interface are correctly placed and sized, then each substance separated by the nano-column is smoothly converted into the gas phase, the peak profile is nicely reproduced, and high quality mass spectra are generated. Major advantages of this technical solution are the following: 1) It delivers high-quality, fully library matchable mass spectra of most sub-1 kDa molecules amenable by HPLC, 2) It is a chemical ionization free interface (unless operated intentionally) with accurate reproduction of the expected isotope ion abundances, 3) Response is never influenced by matrix components in the sample or in the mobile phase, 4) It can be considered a universal detector for small molecules because response is not related to compound polarity.

== Performance and applications ==
=== Mass spectral quality ===
A key feature of this interface is to produce top quality EI spectra from compounds dissolved in a liquid phase. In this case, quality is intended as a measure of the degree of success in a virtual comparison with thousands of spectra stored in the electronic libraries. Identification capability in real-world applications, when peaks are small and noise is high, can be greatly influenced by the quality of ionization. A NIST library version 2.0d was used for comparison. In this case, identification capability is not compromised by the presence of solvent vapor residues and matching quality tops that of a typical GC-MS system.

=== Response versus matrix composition ===
In electrospray ionization (ESI), coeluted matrix components can influence signal intensity through a competition for available charges and for the access to the droplet surface for gas-phase emission, thus creating the so-called matrix effects. Matrix effects can occur at different stages of the interfacing process leading to unpredictably enhanced or suppressed signal response. Direct-EI interface, using a gas phase ionization technique, can eliminate most matrix effects observed with ESI. In fact, it is influenced neither by the mobile phase nor by other matrix components so that the signal response is always proportional only to analyte concentration. This simplifies sample preparation procedures that can be very complex and time-consuming prior to ESI.

=== Other performance aspects ===
The evaluation of the performance cannot be considered complete without considering the limit of detection, the range of linear response and the signal reproducibility. EI is known as a low-efficiency ionization technique. Because less than 1/10 000 of the gas-phase sample molecules are ionized, impressive detection limits cannot be expected. However, the efficient interfacing mechanism of this interface allows picogram-level detection limit in selected ion monitoring (SIM) for most substances. On the other hand, soft ionization techniques such as ESI are, in some cases, far more efficient but generate fewer fragment ions. The cost of this attitude is paid in terms of structural information so that a second analyzer to generate MS/MS spectra is an obligation. A typical EI spectrum, in general, has extensive structural information, and a cheaper, single-stage mass spectrometer might be sufficient for analyte characterization or identification. As a rule of the thumb, nanogram-level sensitivity is obtained in full-scan mode for most substances. Linearity and reproducibility are two point of strength of the interface. Up to four orders of magnitude linearity with RSD lower than 10% are common values in many applications.

=== Applications ===
Direct-EI may offer a clear advantage over ESI in several applications, but it may excel in the following cases:

- Large number of compounds of different polarities and chemical properties: EI can offer a shortcut, do-it-all solution when hard-to-detect substances are included or and when a combination of positive and negative ion detection runs are required for complete coverage of analyte detection.
- Characterization of unknowns: library matching offer an invaluable tool for compound identification.
- Detection of non chromophoric compounds that also give poor or no signal with API: for these compounds additional HPLC detectors such as evaporative light scattering detector (ELSD), refractive index (RI) or corona discharge aerosol detector (CAD) are also available but each of them has limitations which restrain obtaining a universal detection with reasonable sensitivity. EI-MS would offer a suitable solution for this type of compounds, in terms of sensitivity and universal response. GC is anyway feasible only for compounds with high to medium volatility and therefore cannot be adopted for a full characterization of mixtures of complex nature. The possibility of hyphenating EI to HPLC separation represents an ideal solution.
- Quantitative analyses in presence of matrix effects: EI-MS offers a superior performance compared to ESI or APCI when intruding interferences from complex matrices pass cleanup procedure and cause signal suppression or enhancement.
