= Ion source =

Device that creates charged atoms and molecules (ions)

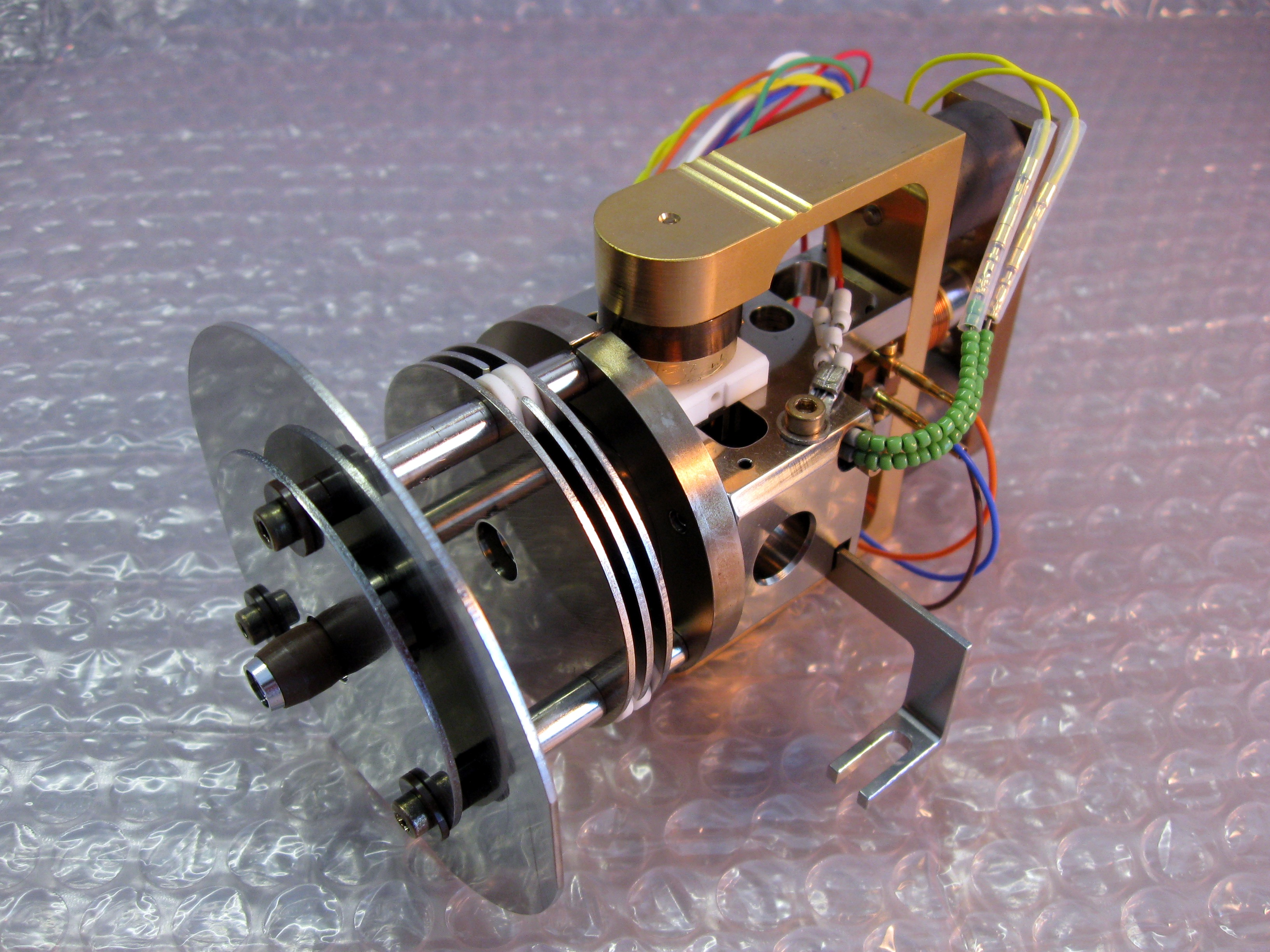
Mass spectrometer EI/CI ion source

An ion source is a device that creates atomic and molecular ions. Ion sources are used to form ions for mass spectrometers, optical emission spectrometers, particle accelerators, ion implanters and ion engines.

== Electron ionization ==
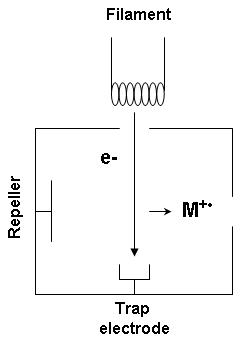
Electron ionization source schematic

Electron ionization is widely used in mass spectrometry, particularly for organic molecules. The gas phase reaction producing electron ionization is

$$\ce{M{} + e^- -> M^{+\bullet}{} + 2e^-}$$

where M is the atom or molecule being ionized, $\ce{e^-}$ is the electron, and $\ce{M^{+\bullet}}$ is the resulting ion.

The electrons may be created by an arc discharge between a cathode and an anode.

An electron beam ion source (EBIS) is used in atomic physics to produce highly charged ions by bombarding atoms with a powerful electron beam. Its principle of operation is shared by the electron beam ion trap.

=== Electron capture ionization ===
Electron capture ionization (ECI) is the ionization of a gas phase atom or molecule by attachment of an electron to create an ion of the form A^{−•}. The reaction is

$$\ce{A + e^- ->[M] A^-}$$

where the M over the arrow denotes that to conserve energy and momentum a third body is required (the molecularity of the reaction is three).

Electron capture can be used in conjunction with chemical ionization.

An electron capture detector is used in some gas chromatography systems.

== Chemical ionization ==
Chemical ionization (CI) is a lower energy process than electron ionization because it involves ion/molecule reactions rather than electron removal. The lower energy yields less fragmentation and usually a simpler spectrum. A typical CI spectrum has an easily identifiable molecular ion.

In a CI experiment, ions are produced through the collision of the analyte with ions of a reagent gas in the ion source. Some common reagent gases include methane, ammonia, and isobutane. Inside the ion source, the reagent gas is present in large excess compared to the analyte. Electrons entering the source will preferentially ionize the reagent gas. The resultant collisions with other reagent gas molecules will create an ionization plasma. Positive and negative ions of the analyte are formed by reactions with this plasma. For example, protonation occurs by

$\ce{CH4 + e^- -> CH4+ + 2e^-}$ (primary ion formation),

$\ce{CH4 + CH4+ -> CH5+ + CH3}$ (reagent ion formation),

$\ce{M + CH5+ -> CH4 + [M + H]+}$ (product ion formation, e.g. protonation).

=== Charge exchange ionization ===
Charge-exchange ionization (also known as charge-transfer ionization) is a gas phase reaction between an ion and an atom or molecule in which the charge of the ion is transferred to the neutral species.

$$\ce{A+ + B -> A + B+}$$

=== Chemi-ionization ===
Chemi-ionization is the formation of an ion through the reaction of a gas phase atom or molecule with an atom or molecule in an excited state. Chemi-ionization can be represented by

$$\ce{G^\ast{} + M -> G{} + M^{+\bullet}{} + e^-}$$

where G is the excited state species (indicated by the superscripted asterisk), and M is the species that is ionized by the loss of an electron to form the radical cation (indicated by the superscripted "plus-dot").

=== Associative ionization ===
Associative ionization is a gas phase reaction in which two atoms or molecules interact to form a single product ion. One or both of the interacting species may have excess internal energy.

For example,

$$\ce{A^\ast{} + B -> AB^{+\bullet}{} + e^-}$$

where species A with excess internal energy (indicated by the asterisk) interacts with B to form the ion AB^{+}.

=== Penning ionization ===
Penning ionization is a form of chemi-ionization involving reactions between neutral atoms or molecules. The process is named after the Dutch physicist Frans Michel Penning who first reported it in 1927. Penning ionization involves a reaction between a gas-phase excited-state atom or molecule G^{*} and a target molecule M resulting in the formation of a radical molecular cation M^{+.}, an electron e^{−}, and a neutral gas molecule G:

$$\ce{G^\ast{} + M -> G{} + M^{+\bullet}{} + e^-}$$

Penning ionization occurs when the target molecule has an ionization potential lower than the internal energy of the excited-state atom or molecule.

Associative Penning ionization can proceed via

$$\ce{G^\ast{} + M -> MG^{+\bullet}{} + e^-}$$

Surface Penning ionization (also known as Auger deexcitation) refers to the interaction of the excited-state gas with a bulk surface S, resulting in the release of an electron according to

$$\ce{G^\ast{} + S -> G{} + S{} + e^-}$$.

=== Ion attachment ===
Ion-attachment ionization is similar to chemical ionization in which a cation is attached to the analyte molecule in a reactive collision:

$$\ce{M + X+ + A -> MX+ + A}$$

Where M is the analyte molecule, X^{+} is the cation and A is a non-reacting collision partner.

In a radioactive ion source, a small piece of radioactive material, for instance ^{63}Ni or ^{241}Am, is used to ionize a gas. This is used in ionization smoke detectors and ion mobility spectrometers.

== Gas-discharge ion sources ==
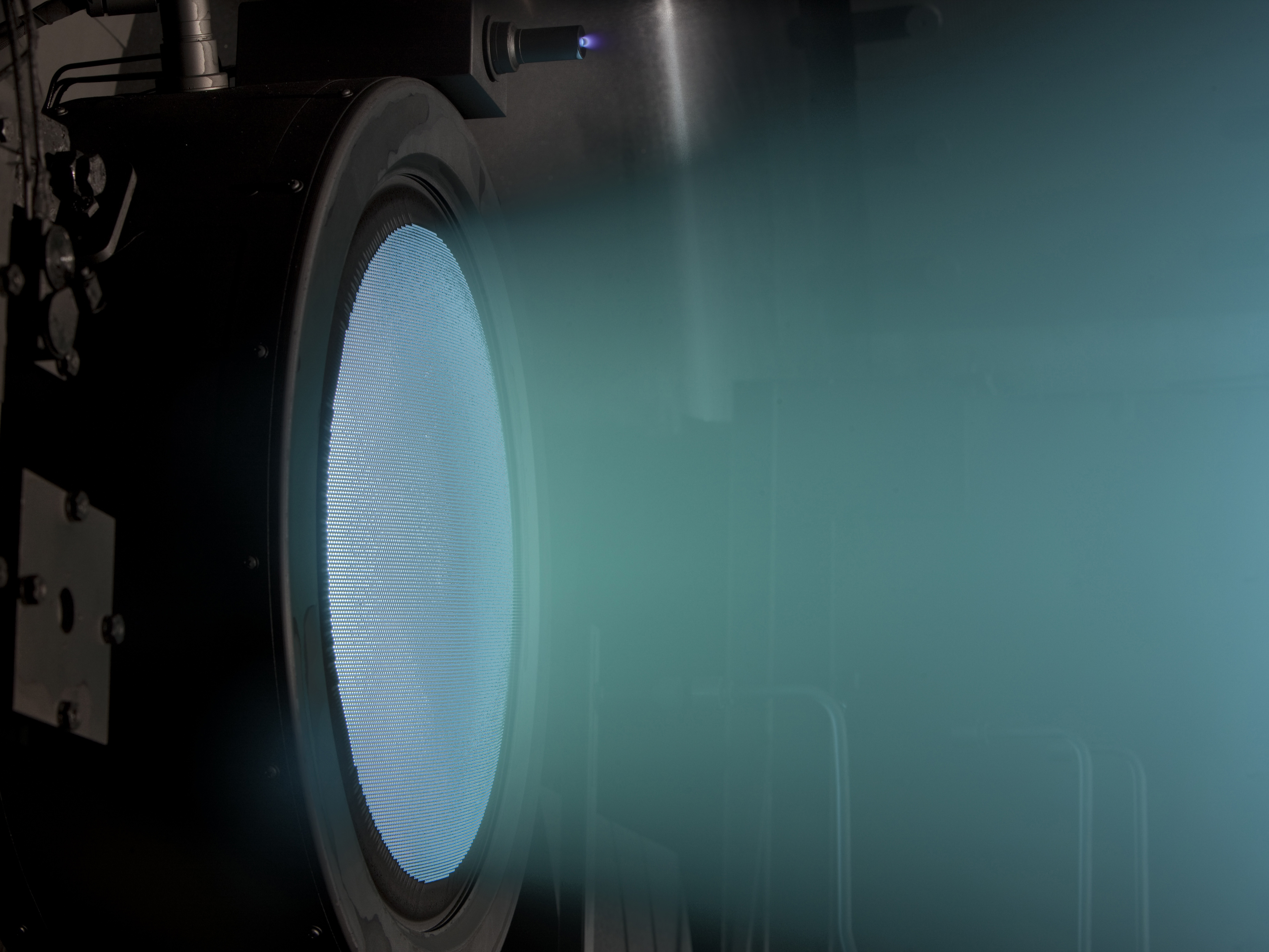
NASA's NEXT space craft propulsion system

These ion sources use a plasma source or electric discharge to create ions.

=== Inductively-coupled plasma ===
Ions can be created in an inductively coupled plasma, which is a plasma source in which the energy is supplied by electrical currents which are produced by electromagnetic induction, that is, by time-varying magnetic fields.

=== Microwave-induced plasma ===
Microwave induced plasma ion sources are capable of exciting electrodeless gas discharges to create ions for trace element mass spectrometry. A microwave plasma has high frequency electromagnetic radiation in the GHz range. It is capable of exciting electrodeless gas discharges. If applied in surface-wave-sustained mode, they are especially well suited to generate large-area plasmas of high plasma density. If they are both in surface-wave and resonator mode, they can exhibit a high degree of spatial localization. This allows to spatially separate the location of plasma generations from the location of surface processing. Such a separation (together with an appropriate gas-flow scheme) may help reduce the negative effect, that particles released from a processed substrate may have on the plasma chemistry of the gas phase.

=== ECR ion source ===
The ECR ion source makes use of the electron cyclotron resonance to ionize a plasma. Microwaves are injected into a volume at the frequency corresponding to the electron cyclotron resonance, defined by the magnetic field applied to a region inside the volume. The volume contains a low pressure gas.

=== Glow discharge ===
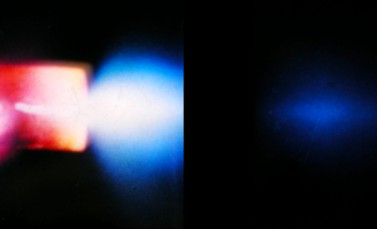
Capillaritron with quartz capillary in operation within a vacuum chamber: On the left the glowing capillary with the plasma up to the extraction cathode and on the right behind it the bluish glowing ion beam.

Ions can be created in an electric glow discharge. A glow discharge is a plasma formed by the passage of electric current through a low-pressure gas. It is created by applying a voltage between two metal electrodes in an evacuated chamber containing gas. When the voltage exceeds a certain value, called the striking voltage, the gas forms a plasma.

A duoplasmatron is a type of glow discharge ion source that consists of a hot cathode or cold cathode that produces a plasma that is used to ionize a gas. They can produce positive or negative ions. They are used for secondary ion mass spectrometry, ion beam etching, and high-energy physics.

=== Flowing afterglow ===
In a flowing plasma afterglow, ions are formed in a flow of inert gas, typically helium or argon. Reagents are added downstream to create ion products and study reaction rates. Flowing-afterglow mass spectrometry is used for trace gas analysis for organic compounds.

=== Spark ionization ===
Electric spark ionization is used to produce gas phase ions from a solid sample. When incorporated with a mass spectrometer the complete instrument is referred to as a spark ionization mass spectrometer or as a spark source mass spectrometer (SSMS).

A closed drift ion source uses a radial magnetic field in an annular cavity in order to confine electrons for ionizing a gas. They are used for ion implantation and for space propulsion (Hall-effect thrusters).

== Photoionization ==
Photoionization is the ionization process in which an ion is formed from the interaction of a photon with an atom or molecule.

=== Multi-photon ionization ===
In multi-photon ionization (MPI), several photons of energy below the ionization threshold may actually combine their energies to ionize an atom.

Resonance-enhanced multiphoton ionization (REMPI) is a form of MPI in which one or more of the photons accesses a bound-bound transition that is resonant in the atom or molecule being ionized.

=== Atmospheric pressure photoionization ===
Atmospheric pressure photoionization (APPI) uses a source of photons, usually a vacuum UV (VUV) lamp, to ionize the analyte with single photon ionization process. Analogous to other atmospheric pressure ion sources, a spray of solvent is heated to relatively high temperatures (above 400 degrees Celsius) and sprayed with high flow rates of nitrogen for desolvation. The resulting aerosol is subjected to UV radiation to create ions. Atmospheric-pressure laser ionization uses UV laser light sources to ionize the analyte via MPI.

== Desorption ionization ==
=== Field desorption ===
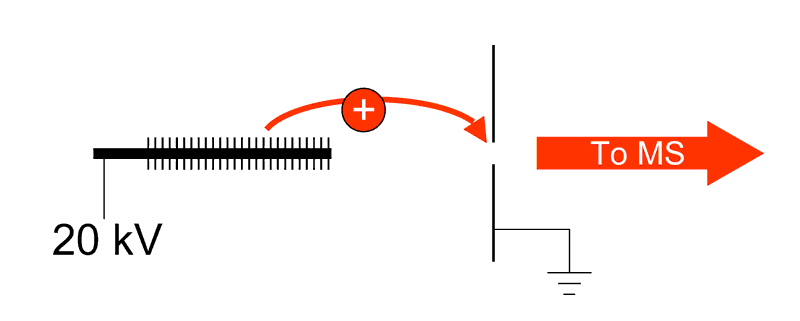
Field desorption schematic

Field desorption refers to an ion source in which a high-potential electric field is applied to an emitter with a sharp surface, such as a razor blade, or more commonly, a filament from which tiny "whiskers" have formed. This results in a very high electric field which can result in ionization of gaseous molecules of the analyte. Mass spectra produced by FI have little or no fragmentation. They are dominated by molecular radical cations M^{+.} and less often, protonated molecules [M + H]^{+}

=== Particle bombardment ===
==== Fast atom bombardment ====
Particle bombardment with atoms is called fast atom bombardment (FAB) and bombardment with atomic or molecular ions is called secondary ion mass spectrometry (SIMS). Fission fragment ionization uses ionic or neutral atoms formed as a result of the nuclear fission of a suitable nuclide, for example the Californium isotope ^{252}Cf.

In FAB the analytes is mixed with a non-volatile chemical protection environment called a matrix and is bombarded under vacuum with a high energy (4000 to 10,000 electron volts) beam of atoms. The atoms are typically from an inert gas such as argon or xenon. Common matrices include glycerol, thioglycerol, 3-nitrobenzyl alcohol (3-NBA), 18-crown-6 ether, 2-nitrophenyloctyl ether, sulfolane, diethanolamine, and triethanolamine. This technique is similar to secondary ion mass spectrometry and plasma desorption mass spectrometry.

==== Secondary ionization ====
Secondary ion mass spectrometry (SIMS) is used to analyze the composition of solid surfaces and thin films by sputtering the surface of the specimen with a focused primary ion beam and collecting and analyzing ejected secondary ions. The mass/charge ratios of these secondary ions are measured with a mass spectrometer to determine the elemental, isotopic, or molecular composition of the surface to a depth of 1 to 2 nm.

In a liquid metal ion source (LMIS), a metal (typically gallium) is heated to the liquid state and provided at the end of a capillary or a needle. Then a Taylor cone is formed under the application of a strong electric field. As the cone's tip get sharper, the electric field becomes stronger, until ions are produced by field evaporation. These ion sources are particularly used in ion implantation or in focused ion beam instruments.

==== Plasma desorption ionization ====
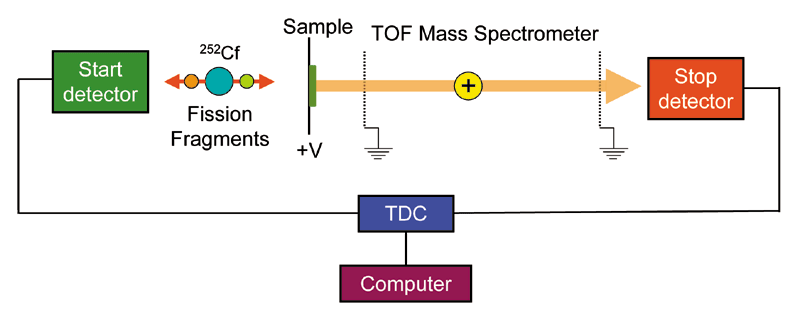
Schematic representation of a plasama desorption time-of-flight mass spectrometer

Plasma desorption ionization mass spectrometry (PDMS), also called fission fragment ionization, is a mass spectrometry technique in which ionization of material in a solid sample is accomplished by bombarding it with ionic or neutral atoms formed as a result of the nuclear fission of a suitable nuclide, typically the californium isotope ^{252}Cf.

=== Laser desorption ionization ===
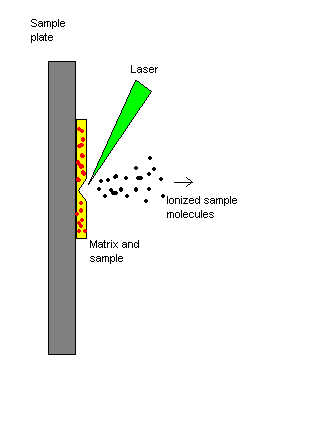
Diagram of a MALDI ion source

Matrix-assisted laser desorption/ionization (MALDI) is a soft ionization technique. The sample is mixed with a matrix material. Upon receiving a laser pulse, the matrix absorbs the laser energy and it is thought that primarily the matrix is desorbed and ionized (by addition of a proton) by this event. The analyte molecules are also desorbed. The matrix is then thought to transfer proton to the analyte molecules (e.g., protein molecules), thus charging the analyte.

==== Surface-assisted laser desorption/ionization ====
Surface-assisted laser desorption/ionization (SALDI) is a soft laser desorption technique used for analyzing biomolecules by mass spectrometry. In its first embodiment, it used graphite matrix. At present, laser desorption/ionization methods using other inorganic matrices, such as nanomaterials, are often regarded as SALDI variants. A related method named "ambient SALDI" – which is a combination of conventional SALDI with ambient mass spectrometry incorporating the DART ion source – has also been demonstrated.

==== Surface-enhanced laser desorption/ionization ====
Surface-enhanced laser desorption/ionization (SELDI) is a variant of MALDI that is used for the analysis of protein mixtures that uses a target modified to achieve biochemical affinity with the analyte compound.

==== Desorption ionization on silicon ====
Desorption ionization on silicon (DIOS) refers to laser desorption/ionization of a sample deposited on a porous silicon surface.

==== Smalley source ====
A laser vaporization cluster source produces ions using a combination of laser desorption ionization and supersonic expansion. The Smalley source (or Smalley cluster source) was developed by Richard Smalley at Rice University in the 1980s and was central to the discovery of fullerenes in 1985.

==== Aerosol ionization ====
In aerosol mass spectrometry with time-of-flight analysis, micrometer sized solid aerosol particles extracted from the atmosphere are simultaneously desorbed and ionized by a precisely timed laser pulse as they pass through the center of a time-of-flight ion extractor.

== Spray ionization ==
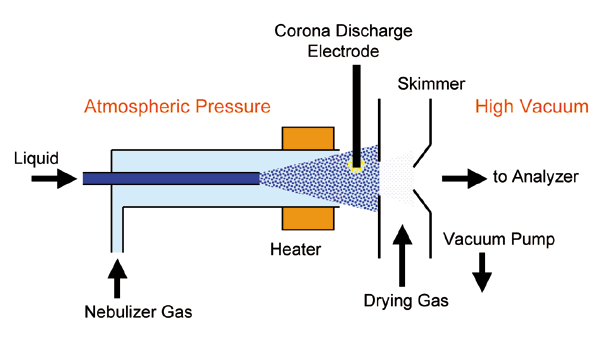
Atmospheric-pressure chemical ionization source

Spray ionization methods involve the formation of aerosol particles from a liquid solution and the formation of bare ions after solvent evaporation.

Solvent-assisted ionization (SAI) is a method in which charged droplets are produced by introducing a solution containing analyte into a heated inlet tube of an atmospheric pressure ionization mass spectrometer. Just as in Electrospray Ionization (ESI), desolvation of the charged droplets produces multiply charged analyte ions. Volatile and nonvolatile compounds are analyzed by SAI, and high voltage is not required to achieve sensitivity comparable to ESI. Application of a voltage to the solution entering the hot inlet through a zero dead volume fitting connected to fused silica tubing produces ESI-like mass spectra, but with higher sensitivity. The inlet tube to the mass spectrometer becomes the ion source.

=== Matrix-Assisted Ionization ===
Matrix-Assisted Ionization (MAI) is similar to MALDI in sample preparation, but a laser is not required to convert analyte molecules included in a matrix compound into gas-phase ions. In MAI, analyte ions have charge states similar to electrospray ionization but obtained from a solid matrix rather than a solvent. No voltage or laser is required, but a laser can be used to obtain spatial resolution for imaging. Matrix-analyte samples are ionized in the vacuum of a mass spectrometer and can be inserted into the vacuum through an atmospheric pressure inlet. Less volatile matrices such as 2,5-dihydroxybenzoic acid require a hot inlet tube to produce analyte ions by MAI, but more volatile matrices such as 3-nitrobenzonitrile require no heat, voltage, or laser. Simply introducing the matrix-analyte sample to the inlet aperture of an atmospheric pressure ionization mass spectrometer produces abundant ions. Compounds at least as large as bovine serum albumin [66 kDa] can be ionized with this method. In this method, the inlet to the mass spectrometer can be considered the ion source.

=== Atmospheric-pressure chemical ionization ===
Atmospheric-pressure chemical ionization uses a solvent spray at atmospheric pressure. A spray of solvent is heated to relatively high temperatures (above 400 degrees Celsius), sprayed with high flow rates of nitrogen and the entire aerosol cloud is subjected to a corona discharge that creates ions with the evaporated solvent acting as the chemical ionization reagent gas. APCI is not as "soft" (low fragmentation) an ionization technique as ESI. Note that atmospheric pressure ionization (API) should not be used as a synonym for APCI.

=== Thermospray ionization ===
Thermospray ionization is a form of atmospheric pressure ionization in mass spectrometry. It transfers ions from the liquid phase to the gas phase for analysis. It is particularly useful in liquid chromatography-mass spectrometry.

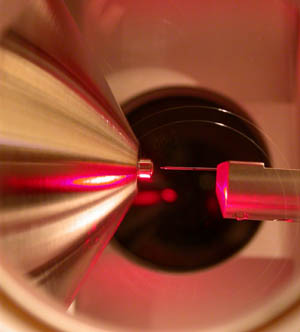
Electrospray ion source

=== Electrospray ionization ===
In electrospray ionization, a liquid is pushed through a very small, charged and usually metal, capillary. This liquid contains the substance to be studied, the analyte, dissolved in a large amount of solvent, which is usually much more volatile than the analyte. Volatile acids, bases or buffers are often added to this solution as well. The analyte exists as an ion in solution either in its anion or cation form. Because like charges repel, the liquid pushes itself out of the capillary and forms an aerosol, a mist of small droplets about 10 μm across. The aerosol is at least partially produced by a process involving the formation of a Taylor cone and a jet from the tip of this cone. An uncharged carrier gas such as nitrogen is sometimes used to help nebulize the liquid and to help evaporate the neutral solvent in the droplets. As the solvent evaporates, the analyte molecules are forced closer together, repel each other and break up the droplets. This process is called Coulombic fission because it is driven by repulsive Coulombic forces between charged molecules. The process repeats until the analyte is free of solvent and is a bare ion. The ions observed are created by the addition of a proton (a hydrogen ion) and denoted [M + H]^{+}, or of another cation such as sodium ion, [M + Na]^{+}, or the removal of a proton, [M − H]^{−}. Multiply charged ions such as [M + 2H]^{2+} are often observed. For macromolecules, there can be many charge states, occurring with different frequencies; the charge can be as great as [M + 24H]^{24+}, for example.

==== Probe electrospray ionization ====
Probe electrospray ionization (PESI) is a modified version of electrospray, where the capillary for sample solution transferring is replaced by a sharp-tipped solid needle with periodic motion.

=== Contactless atmospheric pressure ionization ===
Contactless atmospheric pressure ionization is a technique used for analysis of liquid and solid samples by mass spectrometry. Contactless API can be operated without an additional electric power supply (supplying voltage to the source emitter), gas supply, or syringe pump. Thus, the technique provides a facile means for analyzing chemical compounds by mass spectrometry at atmospheric pressure.

=== Sonic spray ionization ===
Sonic spray ionization is method for creating ions from a liquid solution, for example, a mixture of methanol and water. A pneumatic nebulizer is used to turn the solution into a supersonic spray of small droplets. Ions are formed when the solvent evaporates and the statistically unbalanced charge distribution on the droplets leads to a net charge and complete desolvation results in the formation of ions. Sonic spray ionization is used to analyze small organic molecules and drugs and can analyze large molecules when an electric field is applied to the capillary to help increase the charge density and generate multiple charged ions of proteins.

Sonic spray ionization has been coupled with high performance liquid chromatography for the analysis of drugs. Oligonucleotides have been studied with this method. SSI has been used in a manner similar to desorption electrospray ionization for ambient ionization and has been coupled with thin-layer chromatography in this manner.

=== Ultrasonication-assisted spray ionization ===
Ultrasonication-assisted spray ionization (UASI) is similar to the above techniques but uses an ultrasonic transducer to achieve atomization of the material and generate ions.

== Thermal ionization ==
Thermal ionization (also known as surface ionization, or contact ionization) involves spraying vaporized, neutral atoms onto a hot surface, from which the atoms re-evaporate in ionic form. To generate positive ions, the atomic species should have a low ionization energy, and the surface should have a high work function. This technique is most suitable for alkali atoms (Li, Na, K, Rb, Cs) which have low ionization energies and are easily evaporated.

To generate negative ions, the atomic species should have a high electron affinity, and the surface should have a low work function. This second approach is most suited for halogen atoms Cl, Br, I, At.

== Ambient ionization ==
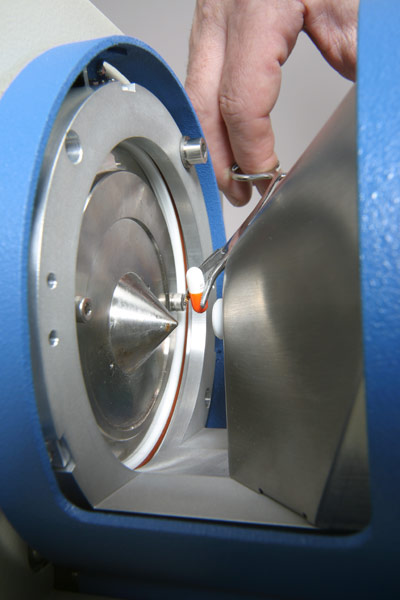
Direct analysis in real time ambient ionization ion source

In ambient ionization, ions are formed outside the mass spectrometer without sample preparation or separation. Ions can be formed by extraction into charged electrospray droplets, thermally desorbed and ionized by chemical ionization, or laser desorbed or ablated and post-ionized before they enter the mass spectrometer.

Solid-liquid extraction based ambient ionization uses a charged spray to create a liquid film on the sample surface. Molecules on the surface are extracted into the solvent. The action of the primary droplets hitting the surface produces secondary droplets that are the source of ions for the mass spectrometer. Desorption electrospray ionization (DESI) creates charged droplets that are directed at a solid sample a few millimeters to a few centimeters away. The charged droplets pick up the sample through interaction with the surface and then form highly charged ions that can be sampled into a mass spectrometer.

Plasma-based ambient ionization is based on an electrical discharge in a flowing gas that produces metastable atoms and molecules and reactive ions. Heat is often used to assist in the desorption of volatile species from the sample. Ions are formed by chemical ionization in the gas phase. A direct analysis in real time (DART) source operates by exposing the sample to a dry gas stream (typically helium or nitrogen) that contains long-lived electronically or vibronically excited neutral atoms or molecules (or "metastables"). Excited states are typically formed in the DART source by creating a glow discharge in a chamber through which the gas flows. A similar method called atmospheric solids analysis probe (ASAP) uses the heated gas from ESI or APCI probes to vaporize sample placed on a melting point tube inserted into an ESI/APCI source. Ionization is by APCI.

Laser-based ambient ionization is a two-step process in which a pulsed laser is used to desorb or ablate material from a sample and the plume of material interacts with an electrospray or plasma to create ions. Electrospray-assisted laser desorption/ionization (ELDI) uses a 337 nm UV laser or 3 μm infrared laser to desorb material into an electrospray source. Matrix-assisted laser desorption electrospray ionization (MALDESI) is an atmospheric pressure ionization source for generation of multiply charged ions. An ultraviolet or infrared laser is directed onto a solid or liquid sample containing the analyte of interest and matrix desorbing neutral analyte molecules that are ionized by interaction with electrosprayed solvent droplets generating multiply charged ions. Laser ablation electrospray ionization (LAESI) is an ambient ionization method for mass spectrometry that combines laser ablation from a mid-infrared (mid-IR) laser with a secondary electrospray ionization (ESI) process.

== Applications ==
=== Mass spectrometry ===
In a mass spectrometer a sample is ionized in an ion source and the resulting ions are separated by their mass-to-charge ratio. The ions are detected and the results are displayed as spectra of the relative abundance of detected ions as a function of the mass-to-charge ratio. The atoms or molecules in the sample can be identified by correlating known masses to the identified masses or through a characteristic fragmentation pattern.

=== Particle accelerators ===
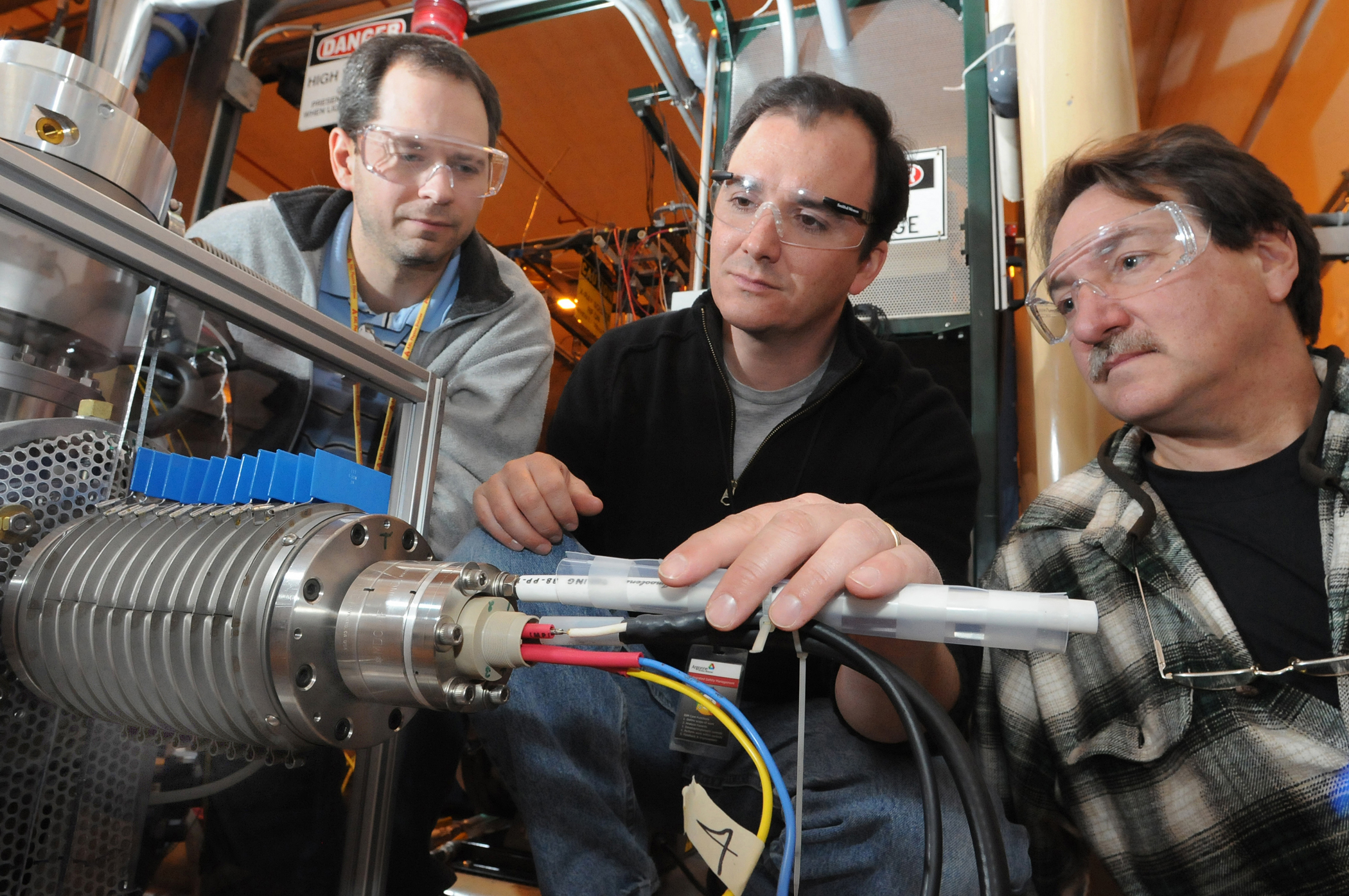
Surface ionization source at the Argonne Tandem Linear Accelerator System (ATLAS)

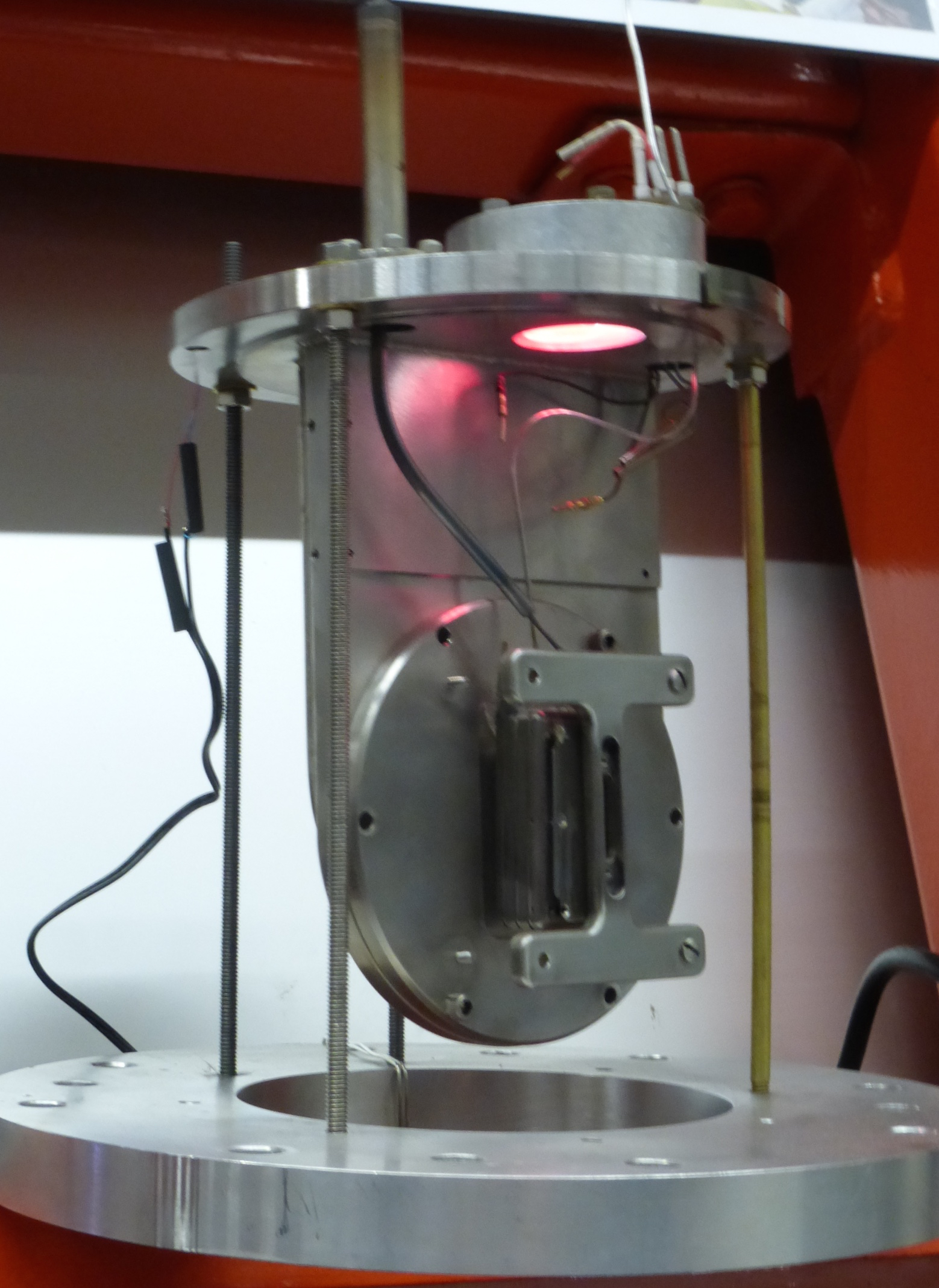
Ion source used in the Cockcroft–Walton pre-accelerator at Fermilab

In particle accelerators an ion source creates a particle beam at the beginning of the machine, the source. The technology to create ion sources for particle accelerators depends strongly on the type of particle that needs to be generated: electrons, protons, H^{−} ion or heavy ions.

Electrons are generated with an electron gun, of which there are many varieties.

Protons are generated with a plasma-based device, like a duoplasmatron or a magnetron.

H^{−} ions are generated with a magnetron or a Penning source. A magnetron consists of a central cylindrical cathode surrounded by an anode. The discharge voltage is typically greater than 150 V and the current drain is around 40 A. A magnetic field of about 0.2 tesla is parallel to the cathode axis. Hydrogen gas is introduced by a pulsed gas valve. Caesium is often used to lower the work function of the cathode, enhancing the amount of ions that are produced. Large caesiated sources are also used for plasma heating in nuclear fusion devices.

For a Penning source, a strong magnetic field parallel to the electric field of the sheath guides electrons and ions on cyclotron spirals from cathode to cathode. Fast H-minus ions are generated at the cathodes as in the magnetron. They are slowed down due to the charge exchange reaction as they migrate to the plasma aperture. This makes for a beam of ions that is colder than the ions obtained from a magnetron.

Heavy ions can be generated with an electron cyclotron resonance ion source. The use of electron cyclotron resonance (ECR) ion sources for the production of intense beams of highly charged ions has immensely grown over the last decade. ECR ion sources are used as injectors into linear accelerators, Van-de-Graaff generators or cyclotrons in nuclear and elementary particle physics. In atomic and surface physics ECR ion sources deliver intense beams of highly charged ions for collision experiments or for the investigation of surfaces. For the highest charge states, however, Electron beam ion sources (EBIS) are needed. They can generate even bare ions of mid-heavy elements. The Electron beam ion trap (EBIT), based on the same principle, can produce up to bare uranium ions and can be used as an ion source as well.

Heavy ions can also be generated with an ion gun which typically uses the thermionic emission of electrons to ionize a substance in its gaseous state. Such instruments are typically used for surface analysis.

Ion beam deposition system with mass separator

Gas flows through the ion source between the anode and the cathode. A positive voltage is applied to the anode. This voltage, combined with the high magnetic field between the tips of the internal and external cathodes allow a plasma to start. Ions from the plasma are repelled by the anode's electric field. This creates an ion beam.

=== Surface modification ===
- Surface cleaning and pretreatment for large area deposition
- Thin film deposition
- Deposition of thick diamond-like carbon (DLC) films
- Surface roughening of polymers for improved adhesion and/or biocompatibility

== See also ==
- Ion beam
- RF antenna ion source
- On-Line Isotope Mass Separator
