= RF antenna ion source =

Antenna that can produce a particle beam

An RF antenna ion source (or radio frequency antenna ion source) is an internal multi-cusp design that can produce a particle beam of about ~30 to 40 mA current. It is used in high energy particle physics and in accelerator laboratories.

Previous RF antennas would penetrate the porcelain enamel coating on the antenna section at high RF power. This problem has been corrected in the development stage with a ten layer coating of titanium dioxide, with approximately 1 mm thick coating.

With the development of the RF antenna ion source, or "non-thermionic ion source," the ion source has an advantage over conventional cold cathodes and hot filament ion sources. The filament continuously burns out over time with a shorter lifespan, requiring venting of the ion source to atmosphere and rebuilding of the ion source.
