= Coulomb meter =

Coulomb meter may refer to:

- Coulombmeter – instrument to measure the electrostatic charge of a material
- Coulomb meter, Coulometer, or Voltameter – instrument to measure the electric charge from the passing electric current
- Coulomb-meter – SI unit of electric dipole moment
