= Atmospheric-pressure laser ionization =

Atmospheric pressure laser ionization is an atmospheric pressure ionization method for mass spectrometry (MS). Laser light in the UV range is used to ionize molecules in a resonance-enhanced multiphoton ionization (REMPI) process. It is a selective and sensitive ionization method for aromatic and polyaromatic compounds. Atmospheric photoionization is the latest in development of atmospheric ionization methods.

== Ionization principle ==
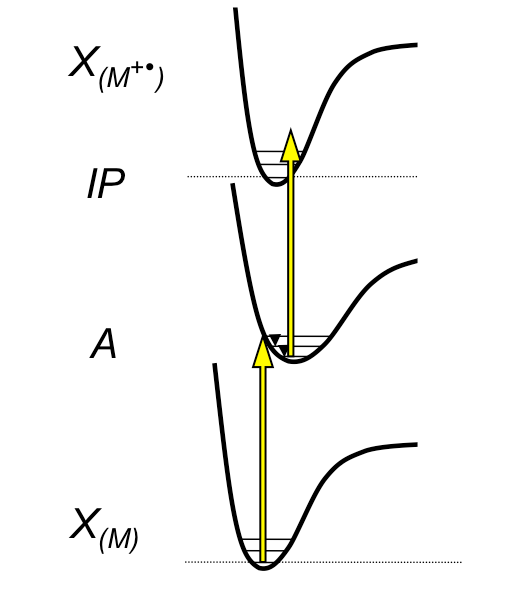
APLI Ionization Mechanism: A molecule M is brought from the electronic ground state into an electronically excited state A by the absorption of a photon if the energy of the photon fits to the energy of an excited state. The molecule relaxes afterwards or by the absorption of a second photon at sufficiently high photon fluxes, the ionization potential is reached: One electron is removed from the molecule and a radical-cation is formed. For efficient ionization by the absorption of two photons a high density of electronic states in the intermediate region is necessary.

The excitation of electrons in atoms and molecules by the absorption of one or more photons can be sufficient for the spatial separation of the electron and the atom or molecule. In the gas phase, this process is called photoionization. The combined energy of the absorbed photons in this process must be above the ionization potential of the atom or molecule.

In the simplest case, a single photon has sufficient energy to overcome the ionization potential. This process is therefore called single photon ionization, it is the basic principle of atmospheric pressure photoionization (APPI). For sufficiently high power densities of the incident light also nonlinear absorption processes like the absorption of at least two photons in a rapid sequence via virtual or real states can occur. If the combined energy of the absorbed photons is higher than the ionization potential, this multiphoton absorption process can also lead to ionization of the atom or molecule. This process is called multi-photon ionization (MPI).

The laser light sources used in APLI have power densities which allow multiphoton ionization via stable electronic states of the molecule or atom. The required power density has to be sufficiently high, so that in the lifetime of the first reached electronic state, which is in the range of a few nanoseconds, a second photon can be absorbed with a reasonable probability. Then a radical cation is formed:

$$\ce{\mathsf{M ->[{h\nu\ (5\ \ce{eV})}] M^\ast ->[{h\nu\ (5\ \ce{eV})}] {M^{+.}}+ e^-}}$$

This process is called resonance enhanced multi photon ionization (REMPI). In the case of APLI both absorbed photons have the same wavelength, which is called "1+1 REMPI".

Most of the organic molecules which are favorable for a photoionization method have ionization potentials smaller than approximately 10 eV. Thus APLI utilizes light with a photon energy of around 5 eV which corresponds to a wavelength of about 250 nm, which is in the ultraviolet (UV) part of the electromagnetic spectrum.

Typical laser systems used in APLI are krypton fluoride laser (λ = 248 nm) and frequency quadrupled Nd:YAG laser (λ = 266 nm).

== Characteristics ==
APLI has some special characteristics because of the ionization with UV-laser-light:

=== Coupling to atmospheric pressure ion sources ===
APLI can be coupled to an existing atmospheric pressure (AP) ion source with APLI. In principle only the ionizing laser light has to be coupled into the existing ion source through UV transparent windows.

Couplings with separation methods like Supercritical Fluid Chromatography (SFC) and Chip-Electrospray (Chip-ESI) have also been demonstrated with APLI.

=== Selectivity ===
APLI is a selective ionization method, because the 1+1 REMPI ionization requires an adequate existing electronic intermediate state and both electronic transitions must be quantum mechanically allowed. UV tunability and discrete energy states of analyte allow improved ionization with reduced background signal.

In particular polynuclear aromatic compounds fulfil the spectroscopic requirements for 1+1 REMPI, thus APLI is an ideal ionization method for the detection of polycyclic aromatic hydrocarbons (PAH).

The selectivity is also a disadvantage, if the direct ionization of an analyte molecule is not possible with APLI. In this case, the analyte molecule could be chemically coupled with a label molecule which is sensitive to APLI. If such a derivatization reaction is available, the selectivity of APLI can be broadened to other molecule classes.

=== High sensitivity ===
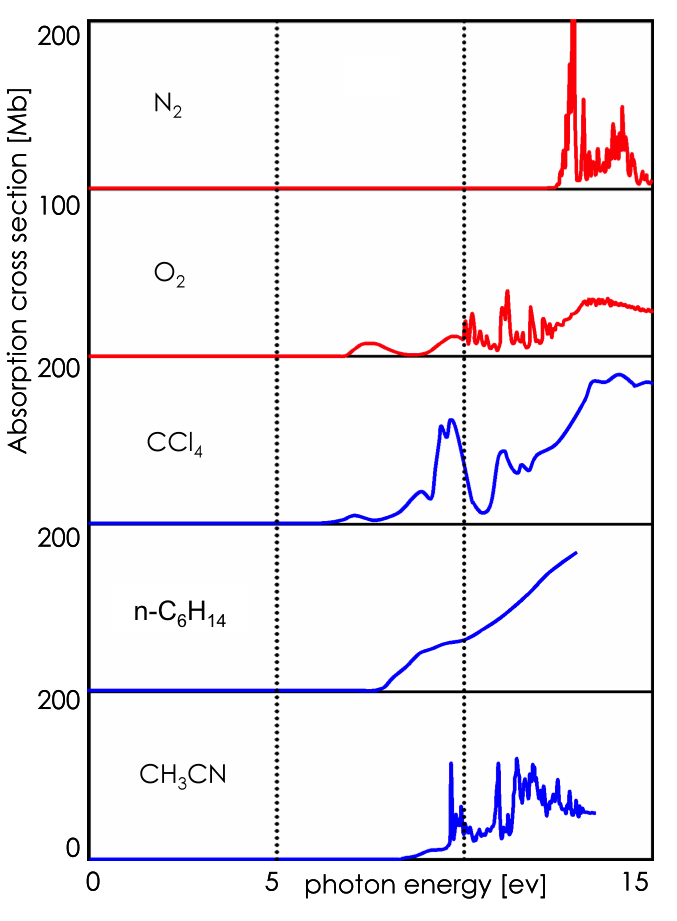
Absorption cross sections of nitrogen, oxygen and some common LC-Solvents at the ionization energies of APPI (10 eV) and APLI (5 eV). The light utilized by APPI is strongly absorbed by substances in the ion source (oxygen and solvent vapor)

In comparison to the single photon ionization (APPI) with vacuum ultraviolet light (λ = 128 nm) APLI is much more sensitive, in particular in applications with liquid chromatography (LC-MS). The selectivity of APLI is one factor contributing to the selectivity, but under LC conditions, APPI suffers from another effect: The VUV light utilized by APPI does not penetrate deep into the ion source geometry, because the solvents used by LC, which are present as vapor in the ion source, strongly absorb the VUV light. For the UV light of APLI the LC solvents are virtually transparent, thus APLI allows the generation of ions in the entire ion source volume.

=== Independence of ion formation from electrical fields ===
In contrast to other ionization methods such as electrospray ionization (ESI) and atmospheric-pressure chemical ionization (APCI), APLI allows the generation of ions independent from electrical fields, because the zone of ion formation is only governed by the laser light. This allows some special methods, like the measurement of the spatial resolved ion signal (distribution of ion acceptance - DIA) with APLI for example, which is applied in the development of new ion sources.

== Literature ==
- Stefan Droste; Marc Schellenträger; Marc Constapel; Siegmar Gäb; Matthias Lorenz; Klaus J Brockmann; Thorsten Benter; Dieter Lubda; Oliver J Schmitz (2005). "A silica‐based monolithic column in capillary HPLC and CEC coupled with ESI‐MS or electrospray‐atmospheric‐pressure laser ionization‐MS". Electrophoresis. 26 (21): 4098–4103. doi:10.1002/elps.200500326. PMID 16252331.
- R. Schiewek; M. Schellenträger; R. Mönnikes; M. Lorenz; R. Giese; K. J. Brockmann; S. Gäb; Th. Benter; O. J. Schmitz (2007). "Ultrasensitive Determination of Polycyclic Aromatic Compounds with Atmospheric-Pressure Laser Ionization as an Interface for GC/MS". Analytical Chemistry. 79 (11): 4135–4140. doi:10.1021/ac0700631. PMID 17472342.
