= Atmospheric-pressure photoionization =

Soft ionization method

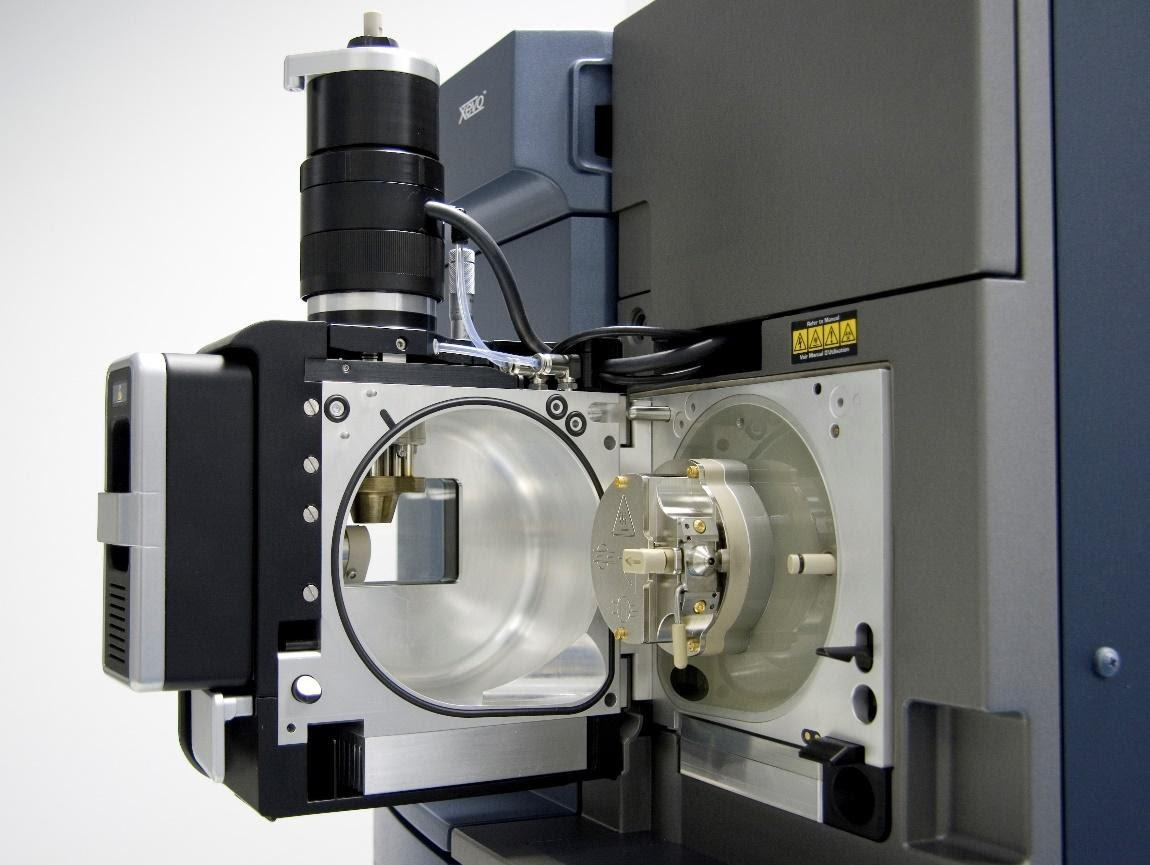
Atmospheric pressure photoionization chamber

Atmospheric pressure photoionization (APPI) is a soft ionization method used in mass spectrometry (MS) usually coupled to liquid chromatography (LC). Molecules are ionized using a vacuum ultraviolet (VUV) light source operating at atmospheric pressure (10^{5} Pa), either by direct absorption followed by electron ejection or through ionization of a dopant molecule that leads to chemical ionization of target molecules. The sample is usually a solvent spray that is vaporized by nebulization and heat. The benefit of APPI is that it ionizes molecules across a broad range of polarity and is particularly useful for ionization of low polarity molecules for which other popular ionization methods such as electrospray ionization (ESI) and atmospheric pressure chemical ionization (APCI) are less suitable. It is also less prone to ion suppression and matrix effects compared to ESI and APCI and typically has a wide linear dynamic range. The application of APPI with LC/MS is commonly used for analysis of petroleum compounds, pesticides, steroids, and drug metabolites lacking polar functional groups and is being extensively deployed for ambient ionization particularly for explosives detection in security applications.

== Instrument configuration ==
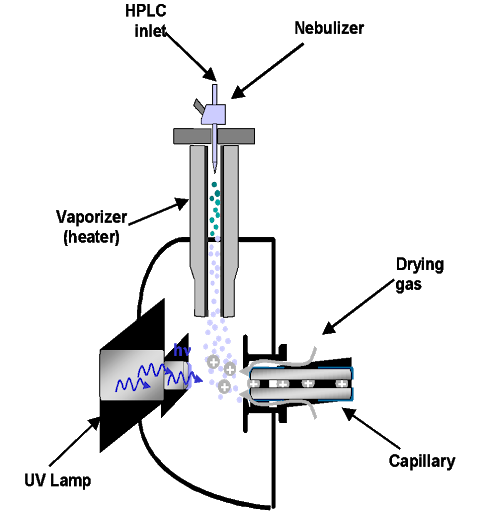

The figure shows the main components of an APPI source: a nebulizer probe which can be heated to 350–500 °C, an ionization region with a VUV photon source, and an ion-transfer region under intermediate pressure that introduces ions into the MS analyzer. The analyte(s) in solution from the HPLC flows into the nebulizer at a flow rate that can range from μL/min to mL/min range. The liquid flow is vaporized by nebulization and heat. The vaporized sample then enters into the radiation zone of the VUV source. Sample ions then enter into the MS interface region, frequently a capillary through the combination of a decreasing pressure gradient and electric fields.

APPI has been commercially developed as dual ionization sources more commonly with APCI, but also with ESI.

== Ionization mechanisms ==
The photoionization mechanism is simplified under vacuum conditions: photon absorption by the analyte molecule, leading to electron ejection, forming a molecular radical cation, M^{•+}. This process is similar to electron ionization common to GC/MS, except that the ionization process is soft, i.e., less fragmentation. In the atmospheric region of an LC/MS system, the ionization mechanism becomes more complex. The unpredictable fate of ions is generally detrimental to LC/MS analysis, but like most processes, once they are better understood, these properties can be exploited to enhance performance. For example, the role of dopant in APPI, first developed and patented for the atmospheric ion source of ion mobility spectrometry (IMS), was adapted to APPI for LC/MS. The basic APPI mechanisms can be summarized by the following scheme:

Direct positive ion APPI

M + hν → M^{•+} + e^{−}	Analyte molecule M is ionized to a molecular radical ion M^{•+}. The radical cation can then abstract an H atom from the abundant solvent to form [M+H]^{+}.
M^{•+} + S → [M + H]^{+} + S[-H]^{•}	Hydrogen abstraction from solvent

Dopant or solvent-assisted positive ion APPI

D + hν → D^{•+} + e^{−}	A photoionizable dopant or solvent D is delivered in large concentration to yield many D^{•+} ions. Photoionizable solvent molecules achieve the same affect.
D^{•+} + M → → [M+H]^{+} + D[-H]^{•}·	D^{•+} ionizes analyte M by proton transfer
D^{•+} + M → → M^{•+} + D	D^{•+} ionizes analyte M by electron transfer

The fundamental process in photoionization is the absorption of a high-energy photon by the molecule and subsequent ejection of an electron. In direct APPI, this process occurs for the analyte molecule, forming the molecular radical cation M^{•+}. The analyte radical cation can be detected as M^{•+} or it can react with surrounding molecules and be detected as another ion. The most common reaction is the abstraction of a hydrogen atom from the abundant solvent to form the stable [M+H]^{+} cation, which is usually the observed ion.

In dopant-APPI (or photoionization-induced APCI), a quantity of photoionizable molecules (e.g., toluene or acetone) is introduced into the sample stream to create a source of charge carriers. Use of a photoionizable solvent can also achieve the same effect. The dopant or solvent ions can then react with neutral analyte molecules via proton transfer or charge exchange reactions. The above table simplifies the dopant process. In fact, there may be extensive ion-molecule chemistry between dopant and solvent before the analyte becomes ionized. APPI can also produce negative ions by creating a high abundance of thermal electrons from dopant or solvent ionization or by photons striking metal surfaces in the ionization source. The cascade of reactions that can lead to M^{−} or dissociative negative ions [M-X]^{−} often involve O_{2} as an electron charge carrier. Examples of negative ionization mechanisms include:

Direct or dopant-assisted negative ion APPI

M + O_{2}^{•−}→ [M − H]^{−} + HO_{2}^{•}	Deprotonation by superoxide O_{2}^{•−}
M + e^{–} → M^{–}	Electron capture
M + O_{2}^{•−}→ M^{−} + O_{2} M + O_{2}^{•−}→ (M − X)^{−} + X^{•} + O_{2} M + O_{2}^{•−}→ (M − X + O)^{−} + OX^{•} Where X = H, Cl, Br, or NO_{2}	Electron transfer Dissociative electron transfer Dissociative electron capture and substitution
M + X^{–} → [M + X]^{–} Where X = Br, Cl, or OAc	Anion attachment

== History ==
Photoionization has a long history of use in mass spectrometry experiments, though mostly for research purposes and not for sensitive analytical applications. Pulsed lasers have been used for non-resonant multiphoton ionization (MPI), resonance-enhanced MPI (REMPI) using tunable wavelengths, and single-photon ionization using sum frequency generation in non-linear media (usually gas cells). Non-laser sources of photoionization include discharge lamps and synchrotron radiation. The former sources were not adaptable to high sensitivity analytical applications because of low spectral brightness in the former case and large "facility-size" in the latter case. Meanwhile, photoionization has been used for GC detection and as a source for ion mobility spectrometry for many years suggesting the potential for use in mass spectrometry.

The first development of APPI for LC/MS was reported by Robb, Covey, and Bruins and by Syage, Evans, and Hanold in 2000. APPI sources were commercialized shortly thereafter by Syagen Technology and made available for most commercial MS systems and by Sciex for their line of MS instruments. Concurrent to the development of APPI was a similar use of a VUV source for low pressure photoionization (LPPI) by Syage and coworkers that accepted atmospheric pressure gas phase samples but stepped down the pressure for ionization to about 1 torr (~100 Pa) before further pressure reduction for introduction into a MS analyzer. This photoionization method is well suited as an interface between gas chromatography (GC) and MS.

== Advantages ==
APPI is most used for LC/MS although it has recently found widespread use in ambient applications such as detection of explosives and narcotics compounds for security applications using ion mobility spectrometry. Compared to the more commonly used predecessor ionization sources ESI and APCI, APPI ionizes a broader range of compounds with the benefit increasing toward the non-polar end of the scale. It also has relatively low susceptibility to ion suppression and matrix effects, which makes APPI very effective in detecting compounds quantitatively in complex matrices. APPI has other advantages including a broader linear range and dynamic range than ESI as seen by the example in the left figure. It is also generally more selective than APCI with reduced background ion signals as shown in the right figure. This latter example also highlights the benefit of APPI vs. ESI in that the HPLC conditions were for non-polar normal-phase in this case using n-hexane solvent. ESI requires polar solvents and further hexane could pose an ignition hazard for ESI and APCI that use high voltages. APPI works well under normal-phase conditions since many of the solvents are photoionizable and serve as dopant ions, which allows specialized applications such as separation of enantiomers (right figure).

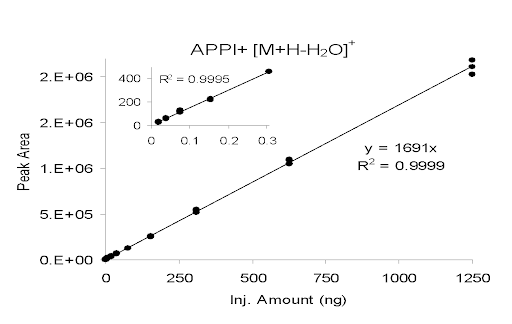

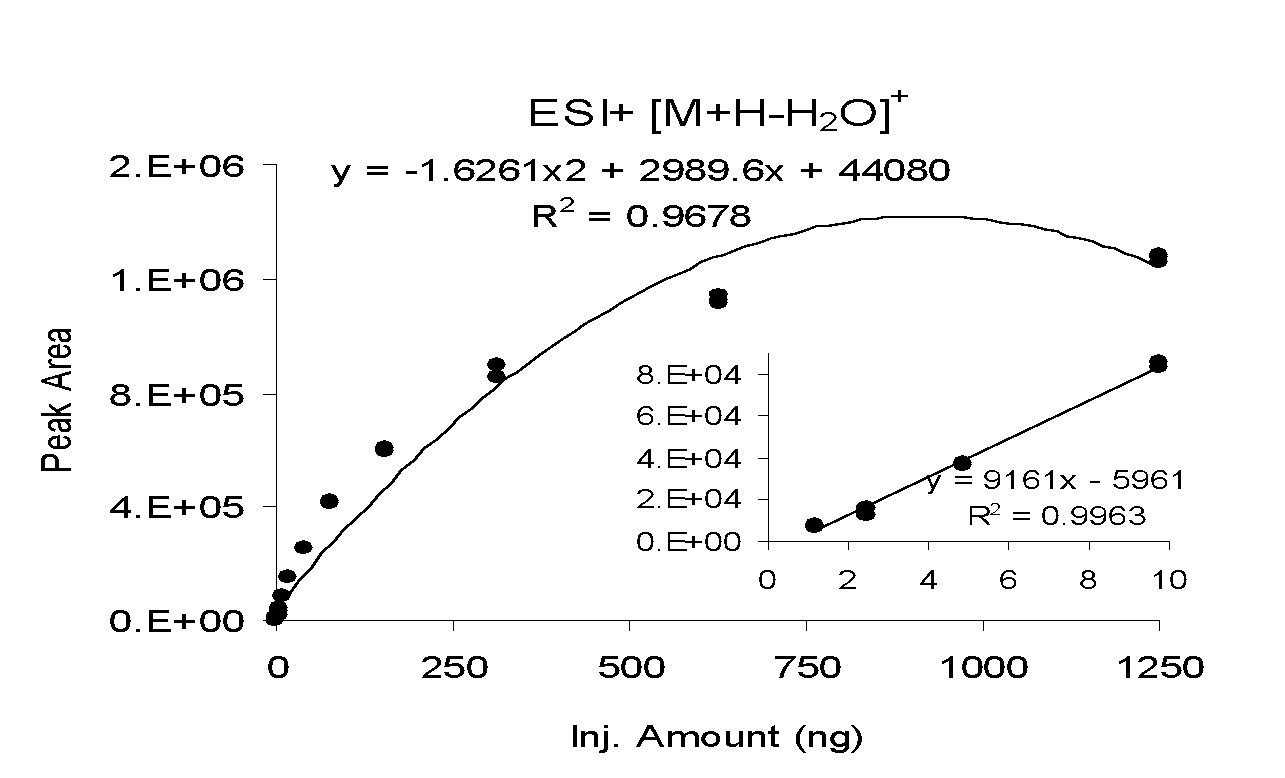
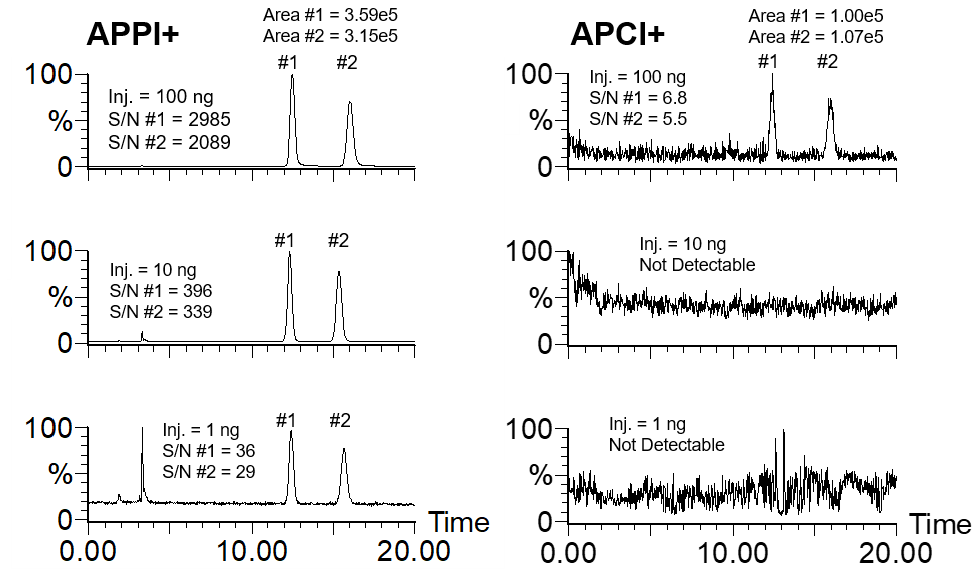

Regarding applicability to a range of HPLC flow rates, the signal level of analytes by APPI has been observed to saturate and even decay at higher solvent flow rates (above 200 μl/min), and therefore, much lower flow rates are recommended for APPI than for ESI and APCI. This has been suggested to be due to absorption of photons by the increasing density of solvent molecules., However, this leads to the benefit that APPI can extend to very low flow rates (e.g., 1 μL/min domain) allowing for effective use with capillary LC and capillary-electrophoresis.

== Application ==
The application of APPI with LC/MS is commonly used for analysis of low polarity compounds such as petroleums, polyatomic hydrocarbons, pesticides, steroids, lipids, and drug metabolites lacking polar functional groups. Excellent review articles can be found in the References.

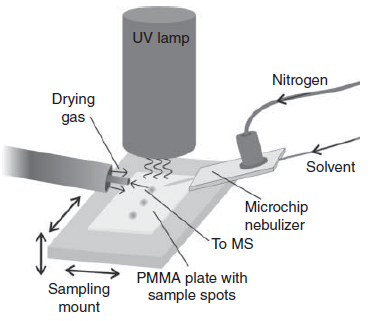

APPI has also been effectively applied for ambient ionization applications lending itself to several practical configurations. One configuration termed desorption APPI (DAPPI) was developed by Haapala et al. and is pictured in the figure here. This device has been applied to the analysis of drugs of abuse in various solid phases, drug metabolites and steroids in urine, pesticides in plant material, etc. APPI has also been interfaced to a DART (direct analysis in real time) source and shown for non-polar compounds such as steroids and pesticides to enhance signal by up to an order of magnitude for N2 flow, which is preferred for DART because it is significantly cheaper and easier to generate then the higher performing use of He. Commercial APPI sources have also been adapted to accept an insertable sampling probe that can deliver or liquid or solid sample to the nebulizer for vaporization and ionization. This configuration is similar to atmospheric solid analysis probe (ASAP) that is based on the use of APCI and therefore is referred to as APPI-ASAP. The benefits of APPI-ASAP vs. APCI-ASAP are similar to those observed in LC/MS, namely higher sensitivity to lower polarity compounds and less background signal for samples in complex matrices. Though ambient ionization has experienced a renaissance in the last decades, it has been used in the security industry for many decades, for example in swab detections at airports. The swabs collect condensed phase material from surfaces and are then inserted into a thermal desorber and ionizer assembly that then flows into the ion detector, which in most cases are an ion mobility spectrometer (IMS), but in later cases have been MS analyzers. A picture of a swab-APPI-IMS system used in airports and other security venues is given in the left figure

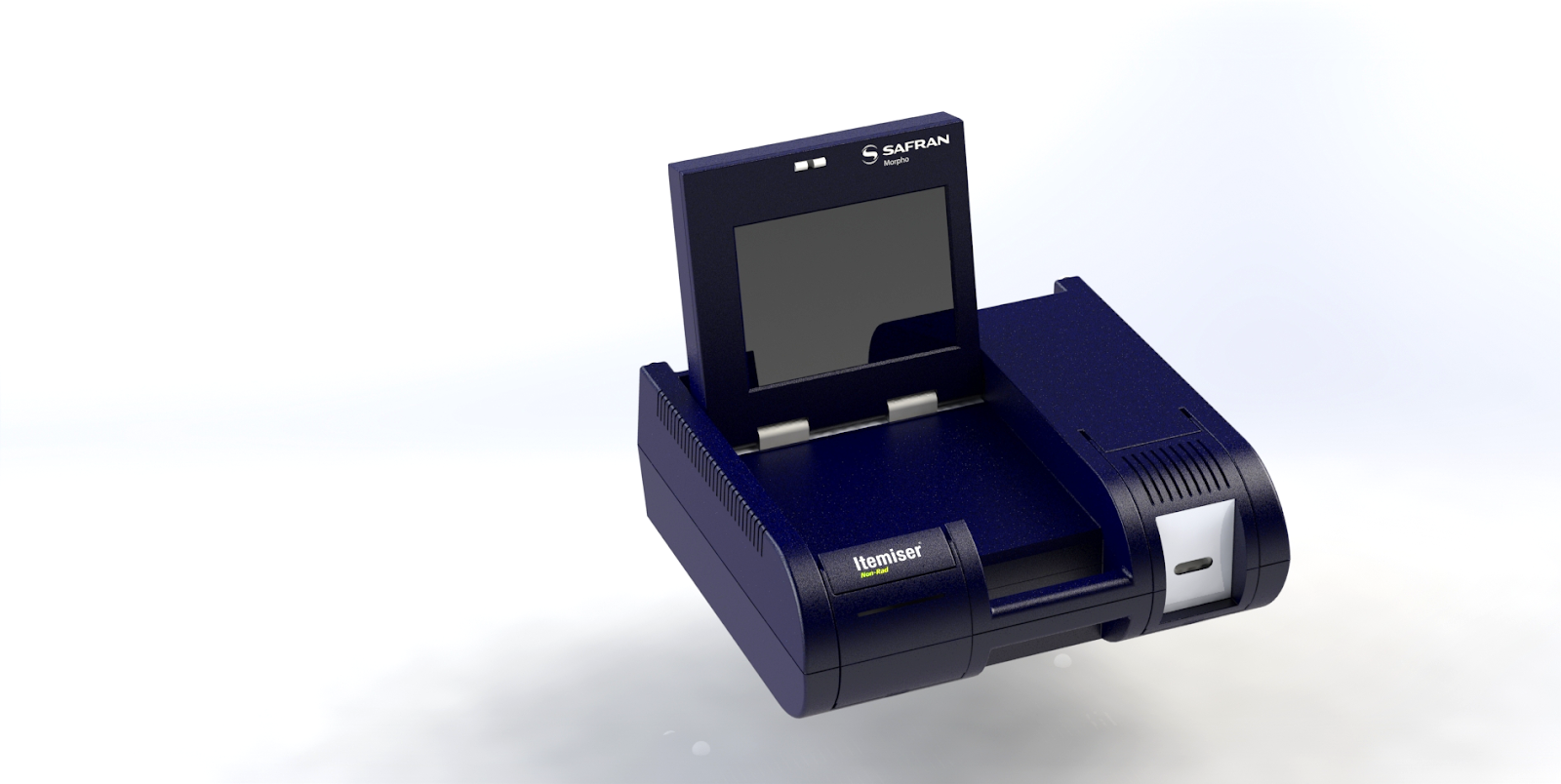
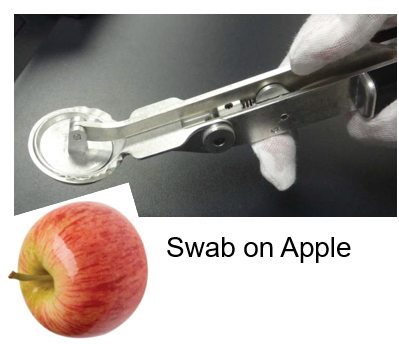

In fact, a swab-APPI-MS system designed for explosives and narcotics detection for security applications performs very well for all types of ambient analysis using a sampling wand and swab (right figure). A particular demonstration (unpublished) showed excellent sensitivity and specificity for detection of pesticide compounds on a variety of fruits and vegetables showing detection limits for 37 priority pesticides ranging from 0.02 to 3.0 ng well below safe limits.

== See also ==
- Atmospheric pressure chemical ionization
- Chemical ionization
- Corona discharge
- Electrospray ionization
- Secondary electrospray ionization
