= Hot-filament ionization gauge =

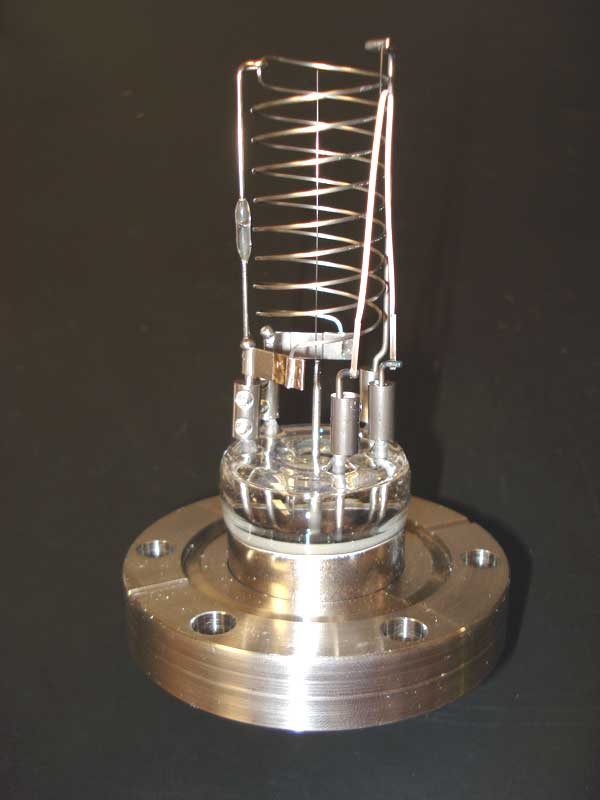
- Bayard-Alpert hot thoriated iridium filament ionization gauge on 2.75 in CF flange
- Other names: Hot-cathode gauge Bayard–Alpert gauge
- Uses: Pressure measurement

The hot-filament ionization gauge, sometimes called a hot-filament gauge or hot-cathode gauge, is the most widely used low-pressure (vacuum) measuring device for the region from 10^{−3} to 10^{−10} Torr. It is a triode, with the filament being the cathode.

Note: Principles are mostly the same for hot-cathode ion sources in particle accelerators to create electrons.

== Function ==
A regulated electron current (typically 10 mA) is emitted from a heated filament. The electrons are attracted to the helical grid by a DC potential of about +150 V. Most of the electrons pass through the grid and collide with gas molecules in the enclosed volume, causing a fraction of them to be ionized. The gas ions formed by the electron collisions are attracted to the central ion collector wire by the negative voltage on the collector (typically −30 V). Ion currents are on the order of 1 mA/Pa. This current is amplified and displayed by a high-gain differential amplifier/electrometer.

This ion current differs for different gases at the same pressure; that is, a hot-filament ionization gauge is composition-dependent. Over a wide range of molecular density, however, the ion current from a gas of constant composition is directly proportional to the molecular density of the gas in the gauge.

== Construction ==
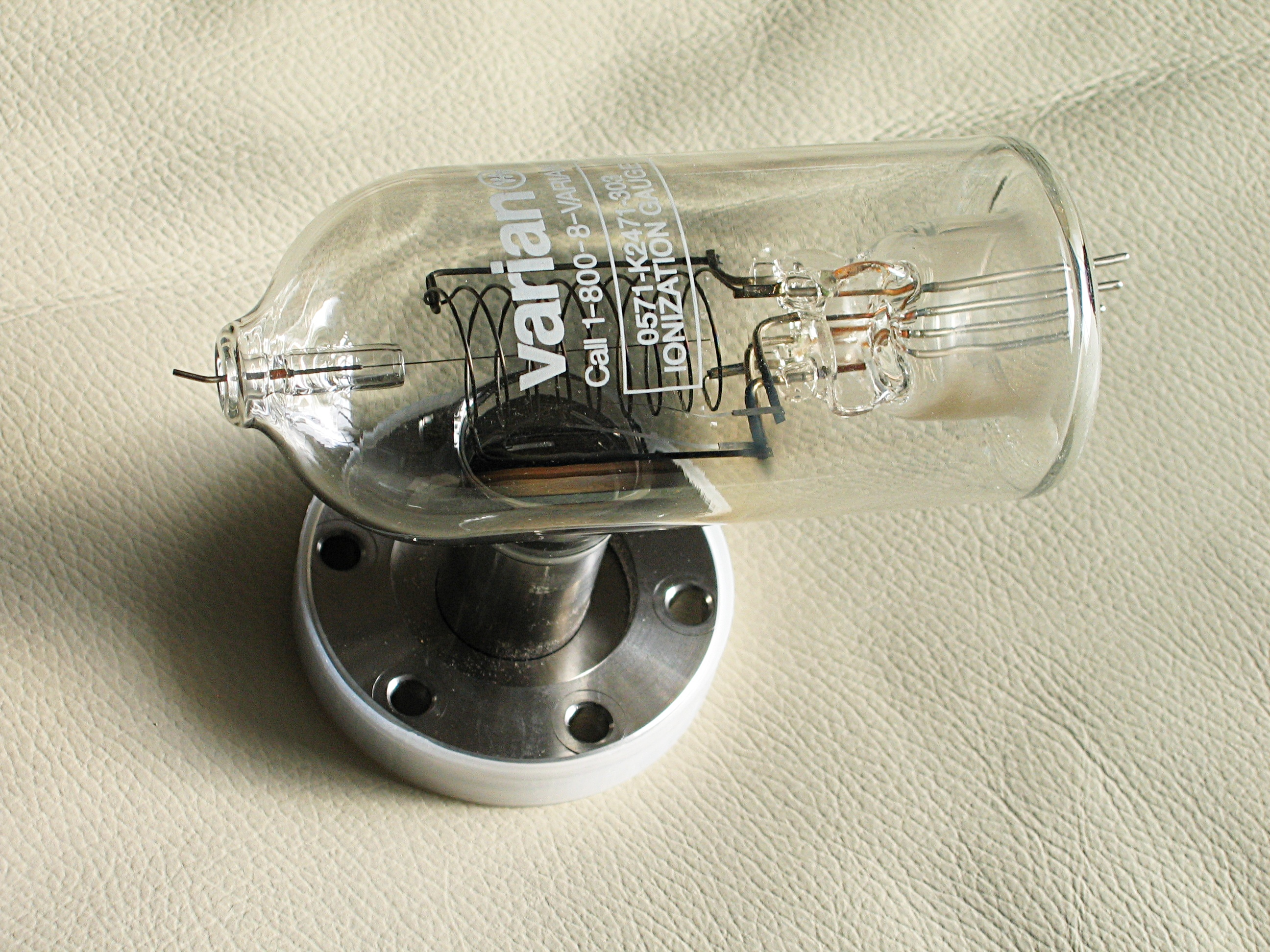
Tubulated hot-cathode ionization gauge

A hot-cathode ionization gauge is composed mainly of three electrodes, all acting as a triode, wherein the cathode is the filament. The three electrodes are a collector or plate, a filament, and a grid. The collector current is measured in picoamperes by an electrometer. The filament voltage to ground is usually at a potential of 30 volts, while the grid voltage at 180–210 volts DC, unless there is an optional electron bombardment feature, by heating the grid, which may have a high potential of approximately 565 volts. The most common ion gauge is the hot-cathode Bayard–Alpert gauge, with a small collector inside the grid. A glass envelope with an opening to the vacuum can surround the electrodes, but usually the nude gauge is inserted in the vacuum chamber directly, the pins being fed through a ceramic plate in the wall of the chamber. Hot-cathode gauges can be damaged or lose their calibration if they are exposed to atmospheric pressure or even low vacuum while hot.

Electrons emitted from the filament move several times in back-and-forth movements around the grid before finally entering the grid. During these movements, some electrons collide with a gas molecule to form a pair of an ion and an electron (electron ionization). The number of these ions is proportional to the gas molecule density multiplied by the electron current emitted from the filament, and these ions pour into the collector to form an ion current. Since the gas molecule density is proportional to the pressure, the pressure is estimated by measuring the ion current.

The low-pressure sensitivity of hot-cathode gauges is limited by the photoelectric effect. Electrons hitting the grid produce X-rays that produce photoelectric noise in the ion collector. This limits the range of older hot-cathode gauges to 10^{−8} Torr and the Bayard–Alpert gauges to about 10^{−10} Torr. Additional wires at cathode potential in the line of sight between the ion collector and the grid prevent this effect. In the extraction type the ions are not attracted by a wire but by an open cone. As the ions are attracted equally to all parts of the cone, the forces pulling them away from the central axis cancel and they pass through the hole in the center forming an ion beam. This ion beam can be passed on to a

- Faraday cup,
- quadrupole mass analyzer with Faraday cup,
- microchannel plate detector with Faraday cup,
- quadrupole mass analyzer with microchannel plate detector Faraday cup,
- ion lens and acceleration voltage and directed at a target to form a sputter gun; in this case a valve lets gas into the grid cage.

== Types ==
- Bayard–Alpert (uses sealed tube).
- Nude gauge (uses the vacuum chamber to make a complete seal).

== See also ==
- Electron ionization
- Ionization gauge
- Vacuum
