= Resonator mode =

In the resonator mode, the plasma density does not exceed the critical density. A standing electromagnetic wave, which is confined by a resonator cavity, penetrates the plasma and sustains it in the regions of highest field intensity. The geometry of this region determines the spatial distribution of the plasma. Plasmas excited in resonator mode are less resistant against detuning, for instance by the insertion of electric probes (Langmuir probes) or electrically conducting samples compared to surface-wave plasmas. There, the high plasma density better shields disturbing potentials.
