= Coulombmeter =

Tool for measuring electrostatic charge

A Coulomb meter is a tool for measuring the electrostatic charge of a material. A Coulombmeter is used in combination with a Faraday cup or a metal probe for taking charge measurements of a material.

A Nanocoulombmeter is a Coulombmeter that is capable of measuring electrostatic charge down to the accuracy of a fraction of a nanocoulomb (nC).

The electrostatic charge of an object can be measured by placing it inside a Faraday Cup. The charge is transferred to the cup and displayed on the meter's display. The Faraday Cup of the Coulombmeter has an outer, grounded metal shield that surrounds an inner electrode. The inner electrode, which is electrically isolated from the shield, is connected to a meter to measure the charge.

In the field of semiconductor design, a coulombmeter consists of a meter used in combination with a metal probe tip to pinpoint locations of excess charge on, for instance, a semiconductor device. This application of a coulombmeter is useful because electrostatic discharge is a leading cause of failure in semiconductor chip designs, and may occur during the fabrication, inspection, assembly, and other processes. A coulombmeter makes it easy to measure electrostatic buildup by simply touching the instrument's probe to the lead.

The coulombmeter was devised in 1984 for the Revised Nuffield Advanced Physics course.

Note: coulombmeter is typically written as a single word to avoid confusion with the measurement unit 'coulombs-meter' and also to make it easily searchable in scientific literature.

== Detection of electron and ion beams ==
A nanocoulombmeter, in combination with a Faraday cup, can be used to detect and measure the beams emitted from electron guns and ion guns.

The Faraday cup consists of a shielded cup with an aperture, which collects the kinetically active electrons or ions, and an output wire, which is connected to a nanocoulombmeter. The Faraday cup can be completely separate from the gun, or it can be part of an assembly mounted to the end of the electron/ion gun and manipulated remotely. Some Faraday cup assemblies include a phosphor screen as well. An array of small Faraday cups or a Faraday cup mounted on a linear manipulator can be used to measure the distribution of the beam current across the spot; this shows the beam uniformity.
