= Surface-wave-sustained discharge =

A surface-wave-sustained discharge is a plasma that is excited by propagation of electromagnetic surface waves. Surface wave plasma sources can be divided into two groups depending upon whether the plasma generates part of its own waveguide by ionisation or not. The former is called a self-guided plasma. The surface wave mode allows the generation of uniform high-frequency-excited plasmas in volumes whose lateral dimensions extend over several wavelengths of the electromagnetic wave, e.g. for microwaves of 2.45 GHz in vacuum the wavelength amounts to 12.2 cm.

== Theory ==
For a long time, microwave plasma sources without a magnetic field were not considered suitable for the generation of high density plasmas. Electromagnetic waves cannot propagate in over-dense plasmas. The wave is reflected at the plasma surface due to the skin effect and becomes an evanescent wave. Its penetration depth corresponds to the skin depth $\delta$, which can be approximated by

$$\delta  \simeq
c\,\big/\sqrt{\omega_{p_e}^2 - \omega^2}.$$

The non-vanishing penetration depth of an evanescent wave opens an alternative way of heating a plasma: Instead of traversing the plasma, the conductivity of the plasma enables the wave to propagate along the plasma surface. The wave energy is then transferred to the plasma by an evanescent wave which enters the plasma perpendicular to its surface and decays exponentially with the skin depth. Transfer mechanism allows to generate over-dense plasmas with electron densities beyond the critical density.

== Design ==
Surface-wave-sustained plasmas (SWP) can be operated in a large variety of recipient geometries. The pressure range accessible for surface-wave-excited plasmas depends on the process gas and the diameter of the recipient. The larger the chamber diameter, the lower the minimal pressure necessary for the SWP mode. Analogously, the maximal pressure where a stable SWP can be operated decreases with increasing diameter.

The numerical modelling of SWPs is quite involved. The plasma is created by the electromagnetic wave, but it also reflects and guides this same wave. Therefore, a truly self-consistent description is necessary.
