= Duoplasmatron =

Illustration of a Duoplasmatron

The Duoplasmatron is an ion source in which a cathode filament emits electrons into a vacuum chamber. A gas such as argon is introduced in very small quantities into the chamber, where it becomes charged or ionized through interactions with the free electrons from the cathode, forming a plasma. The plasma is then accelerated through a series of at least two highly charged grids, and becomes an ion beam, moving at a fairly high speed from the aperture of the device.

== History ==
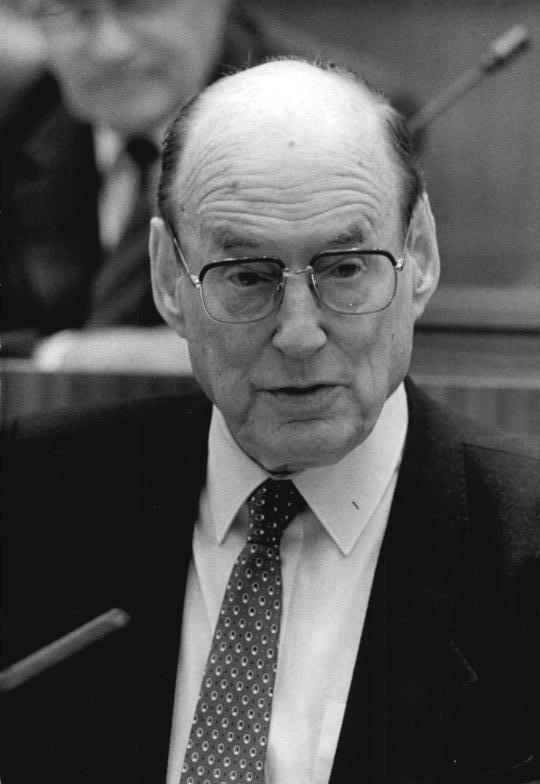
Prof. Dr. Manfred von Ardenne, June 1986

The duoplasmatron was first developed in 1956 by Manfred von Ardenne to provide a powerful source of gas ions. Other contributors such as Demirkanov, Frohlich and Kistemaker continued development between 1959 and 1965. Throughout the 1960s, many continued to investigate, discovering negative ion extraction and multiply charged ion production. There are two types of plasmatrons, the uniplasmatron and the duoplasmatron. The prefix refers to the constriction of discharge.

== Operation ==
The standard duoplasmatron consists of three main components that are responsible for its operation. These include the hot cathode, the intermediate electrode, and the anode. The intermediate electrode's main job is to produce discharge. This discharge is confined to a small portion near the anode and a short magnetic field between the intermediate electrode and the anode. The duoplasmatron has two different types of plasma: the cathode plasma which is close to the cathode and the anode plasma which is close to the anode. The cathode works by injecting a beam of electrons with a suitable amount of energy. This injection ionizes the gas molecules, typically Argon gas, in the anode and increases the potential near the anode. The ions that are repulsed, however, combine with the ions that contain enough energy to pass the deceleration region and this combination of ions fills the expansion cup with directed ions and electrons. The best operational mode for the duoplasmatron is considered to be when the cathode is adjusted to an emission where the intermediate electrode and the cathode potential are approximately equal.

== Applications ==
The duoplasmatron is a type of ion source. Ion sources are necessary to form ions for mass spectrometers and other types of instruments. In comparison to Penning ionization sources, the duoplasmatron features advantages such as less expenditure, easier handling, and a longer lifetime. However, the duoplasmatron does have lower beam intensity, which can be a large disadvantage.
