= Chemical ionization =

Technique in mass spectroscopy

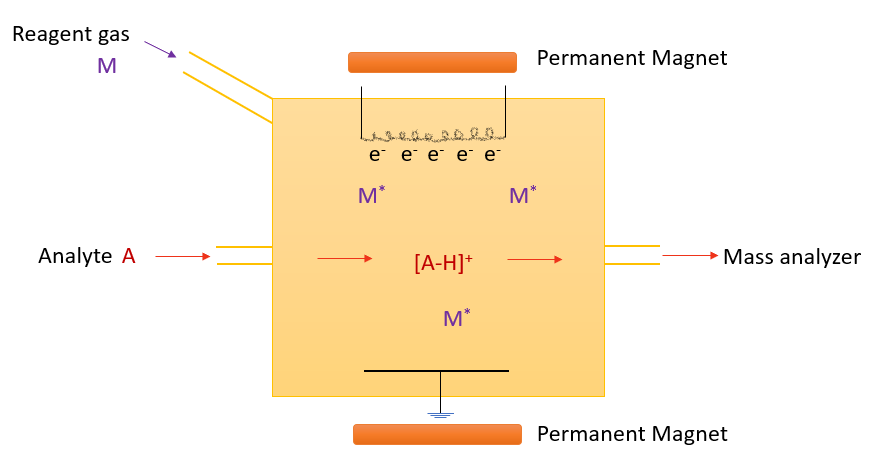
A schematic diagram of chemical ionization source

Chemical ionization (CI) is a soft ionization technique used in mass spectrometry. This was first introduced by Burnaby Munson and Frank H. Field in 1966. This technique is a branch of gaseous ion-molecule chemistry. Reagent gas molecules (often methane or ammonia) are ionized by electron ionization to form reagent ions, which subsequently react with analyte molecules in the gas phase to create analyte ions for analysis by mass spectrometry. Negative chemical ionization (NCI), charge-exchange chemical ionization, atmospheric-pressure chemical ionization (APCI) and atmospheric pressure photoionization (APPI) are some of the common variants of the technique. CI mass spectrometry finds general application in the identification, structure elucidation and quantitation of organic compounds as well as some utility in biochemical analysis. Samples to be analyzed must be in vapour form, or else (in the case of liquids or solids), must be vapourized before introduction into the source.

== Principles of operation ==
The chemical ionization process generally imparts less energy to an analyte molecule than does electron impact (EI) ionization, resulting in less fragmentation and usually a simpler spectrum. The amount of fragmentation, and therefore the amount of structural information produced by the process can be controlled to some degree by selection of the reagent ion. In addition to some characteristic fragment ion peaks, a CI spectrum usually has an identifiable protonated molecular ion peak [M+1]^{+}, allowing determination of the molecular mass. CI is thus useful as an alternative technique in cases where EI produces excessive fragmentation of the analyte, causing the molecular-ion peak to be weak or completely absent.

== Instrumentation ==
The CI source design for a mass spectrometer is very similar to that of the EI source. To facilitate the reactions between the ions and molecules, the chamber is kept relatively gas tight at a pressure of about 1 torr. Electrons are produced externally to the source volume (at a lower pressure of 10^{−4} torr or below) by heating a metal filament which is made of tungsten, rhenium, or iridium. The electrons are introduced through a small aperture in the source wall at energies 200–1000 eV so that they penetrate to at least the centre of the box. In contrast to EI, the magnet and the electron trap are not needed for CI, since the electrons do not travel to the end of the chamber. Many modern sources are dual or combination EI/CI sources and can be switched from EI mode to CI mode and back in seconds.

== Mechanism ==
A CI experiment involves the use of gas phase acid-base reactions in the chamber. Some common reagent gases include: methane, ammonia, water and isobutane. Inside the ion source, the reagent gas is present in large excess compared to the analyte. Electrons entering the source will mainly ionize the reagent gas because it is in large excess compared to the analyte. The primary reagent ions then undergo secondary ion/molecule reactions (as below) to produce more stable reagent ions which ultimately collide and react with the lower concentration analyte molecules to form product ions. The collisions between reagent ions and analyte molecules occur at close to thermal energies, so that the energy available to fragment the analyte ions is limited to the exothermicity of the ion-molecule reaction. For a proton transfer reaction, this is just the difference in proton affinity between the neutral reagent molecule and the neutral analyte molecule. This results in significantly less fragmentation than does 70 eV electron ionization (EI).

The following reactions are possible with methane as the reagent gas.

=== Primary ion formation ===
$$\ce{CH4{} + e^- -> CH4^{+\bullet}{} + 2e^-}$$

=== Secondary reagent ions ===
$$\ce{CH4{} + CH4^{+\bullet} -> CH5+{} + CH3^{\bullet}}$$

$$\ce{CH4 + CH3^+ -> C2H5+ + H2}$$

=== Product ion formation ===
$\ce{M + CH5+ -> CH4 + [M + H]+}$ (protonation)

$\ce{AH + CH3+ -> CH4 + A+}$ ($\ce{H^-}$ abstraction)

$\ce{M + C2H5+ -> [M + C2H5]+}$ (adduct formation)

$\ce{A + CH4+ -> CH4 + A+}$ (charge exchange)

If ammonia is the reagent gas,

$$\ce{NH3{} + e^- -> NH3^{+\bullet}{} + 2e^-}$$

$$\ce{NH3{} + NH3^{+\bullet} -> NH4+{} + NH2}$$

$$\ce{M + NH4^+ -> MH+ + NH3}$$

For isobutane as the reagent gas,

$$\ce{C4H10{} + e^- -> C4H10^{+\bullet}{} + 2e^-} (\ce{ + C3H7+} \text{and other ions})$$

$$\ce{C3H7^+{} + C4H10^{+\bullet} -> C4H9^+{} + C3H8}$$

$$\ce{M + C4H9^+ -> MH^+ + C4H8}$$

Self chemical ionization is possible if the reagent ion is an ionized form of the analyte.

== Advantages and limitations ==
One of the main advantages of CI over EI is the reduced fragmentation as noted above, which for more fragile molecules, results in a peak in the mass spectrum indicative of the molecular weight of the analyte. This proves to be a particular advantage for biological applications where EI often does not yield useful molecular ions in the spectrum. The spectra given by CI are simpler than EI spectra and CI can be more sensitive than other ionization methods, at least in part to the reduced fragmentation which concentrates the ion signal in fewer and therefore more intense peaks. The extent of fragmentation can be somewhat controlled by proper selection of reagent gases. Moreover, CI is often coupled to chromatographic separation techniques, thereby improving its usefulness in identification of compounds. As with EI, the method is limited to compounds that can be vapourized in the ion source. The lower degree of fragmentation can be a disadvantage in that less structural information is provided. Additionally, the degree of fragmentation and therefore the mass spectrum, can be sensitive to source conditions such as pressure, temperature, and the presence of impurities (such as water vapour) in the source. Because of this lack of reproducibility, libraries of CI spectra have not been generated for compound identification.

== Applications ==
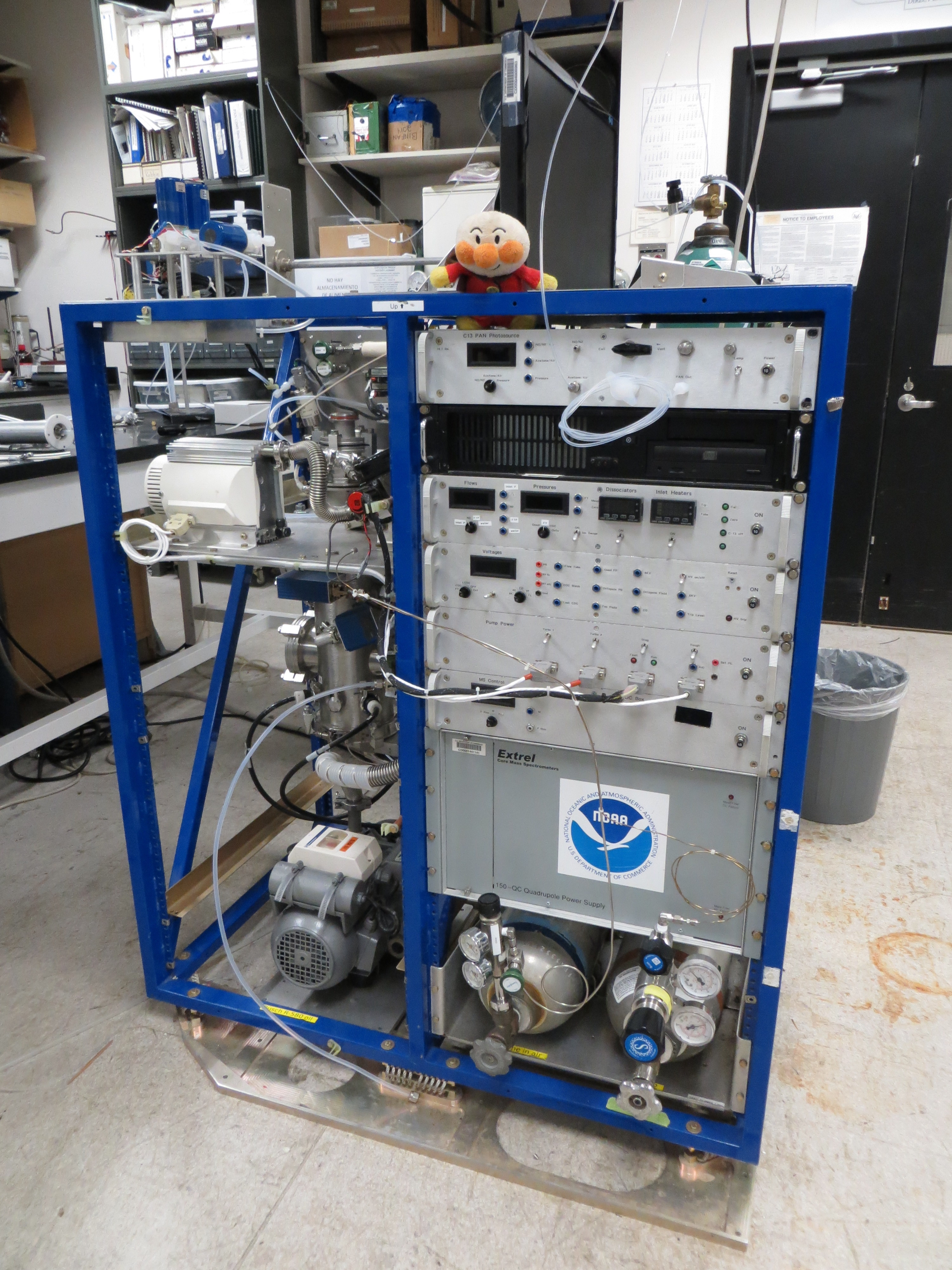
Peroxynitrate chemical ionization mass spectrometer at the US National Oceanic and Atmospheric Administration

CI mass spectrometry is a useful tool in structure elucidation of organic compounds. This is possible with CI, because formation of [M+1]^{+} eliminates a stable molecule, which can be used to guess the functional groups present. Besides that, CI facilitates the ability to detect the molecular ion peak, due to less extensive fragmentation. Chemical ionization can also be used to identify and quantify an analyte present in a sample, by coupling chromatographic separation techniques to CI such as gas chromatography (GC), high performance liquid chromatography (HPLC) and capillary electrophoresis (CE). This allows selective ionization of an analyte from a mixture of compounds, where accurate and precised results can be obtained.

== Variants ==
=== Negative chemical ionization ===
Chemical ionization for gas phase analysis is either positive or negative. Almost all neutral analytes can form positive ions through the reactions described above.

In order to see a response by negative chemical ionization (NCI, also NICI), the analyte must be capable of producing a negative ion (stabilize a negative charge) for example by electron capture ionization. Because not all analytes can do this, using NCI provides a certain degree of selectivity that is not available with other, more universal ionization techniques (EI, PCI). NCI can be used for the analysis of compounds containing acidic groups or electronegative elements (especially halogens).Moreover, negative chemical ionization is more selective and demonstrates a higher sensitivity toward oxidizing agents and alkylating agents.

Because of the high electronegativity of halogen atoms, NCI is a common choice for their analysis. This includes many groups of compounds, such as PCBs, pesticides, and fire retardants. Most of these compounds are environmental contaminants, thus much of the NCI analysis that takes place is done under the auspices of environmental analysis. In cases where very low limits of detection are needed, environmental toxic substances such as halogenated species, oxidizing and alkylating agents are frequently analyzed using an electron capture detector coupled to a gas chromatograph.

Negative ions are formed by resonance capture of a near-thermal energy electron, dissociative capture of a low energy electron and via ion-molecular interactions such as proton transfer, charge transfer and hydride transfer. Compared to the other methods involving negative ion techniques, NCI is quite advantageous, as the reactivity of anions can be monitored in the absence of a solvent. Electron affinities and energies of low-lying valencies can be determined by this technique as well.

=== Charge-exchange chemical ionization ===
This is also similar to CI and the difference lies in the production of a radical cation with an odd number of electrons. The reagent gas molecules are bombarded with high energy electrons and the product reagent gas ions abstract electrons from the analyte to form radical cations. The common reagent gases used for this technique are toluene, benzene, NO, Xe, Ar and He.

Careful control over the selection of reagent gases and the consideration toward the difference between the resonance energy of the reagent gas radical cation and the ionization energy of the analyte can be used to control fragmentation. The reactions for charge-exchange chemical ionization are as follows.

$$\ce{He{} + e^- -> He^{+\bullet}{} + 2e^-}$$
$$\ce{He^{+\bullet}{} + M -> M^{+\bullet}}$$

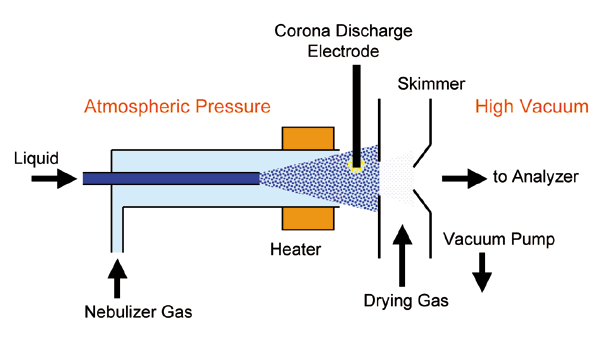
Atmospheric pressure chemical ionization source

=== Atmospheric-pressure chemical ionization ===
Chemical ionization in an atmospheric pressure electric discharge is called atmospheric pressure chemical ionization (APCI), which usually uses water as the reagent gas. An APCI source is composed of a liquid chromatography outlet, nebulizing the eluent, a heated vaporizer tube, a corona discharge needle and a pinhole entrance to 10^{−3} torr vacuum. The analyte is a gas or liquid spray and ionization is accomplished using an atmospheric pressure corona discharge. This ionization method is often coupled with high performance liquid chromatography where the mobile phase containing eluting analyte sprayed with high flow rates of nitrogen or helium and the aerosol spray is subjected to a corona discharge to create ions. It is applicable to relatively less polar and thermally less stable compounds. The difference between APCI and CI is that APCI functions under atmospheric pressure, where the frequency of collisions is higher. This enables the improvement in sensitivity and ionization efficiency.

== See also ==
- Electrospray ionization
- Proton-transfer-reaction mass spectrometry

== Bibliography ==
- Harrison, Alex. G. (1992). Chemical ionization mass spectrometry (2. ed.). Boca Raton, Fla. [u.a.]: CRC Press. ISBN 9780849342547.
- Hunt, Donald F.; McEwen, Charles N.; Harvey, T. Michael. (2002). "Positive and negative chemical ionization mass spectrometry using a Townsend discharge ion source". Analytical Chemistry. 47 (11): 1730–1734. doi:10.1021/ac60361a011.
- Dass, Chhabil (2007). Fundamentals of contemporary mass spectrometry ([Online-Ausg.]. ed.). Hoboken, N.J.: Wiley-Interscience. ISBN 9780470118498.
