= Capillaritron =

Ion and atom beam source in particle physics and for engineering

A capillaritron is a device for creating ion and atom rays.

== Mechanism ==
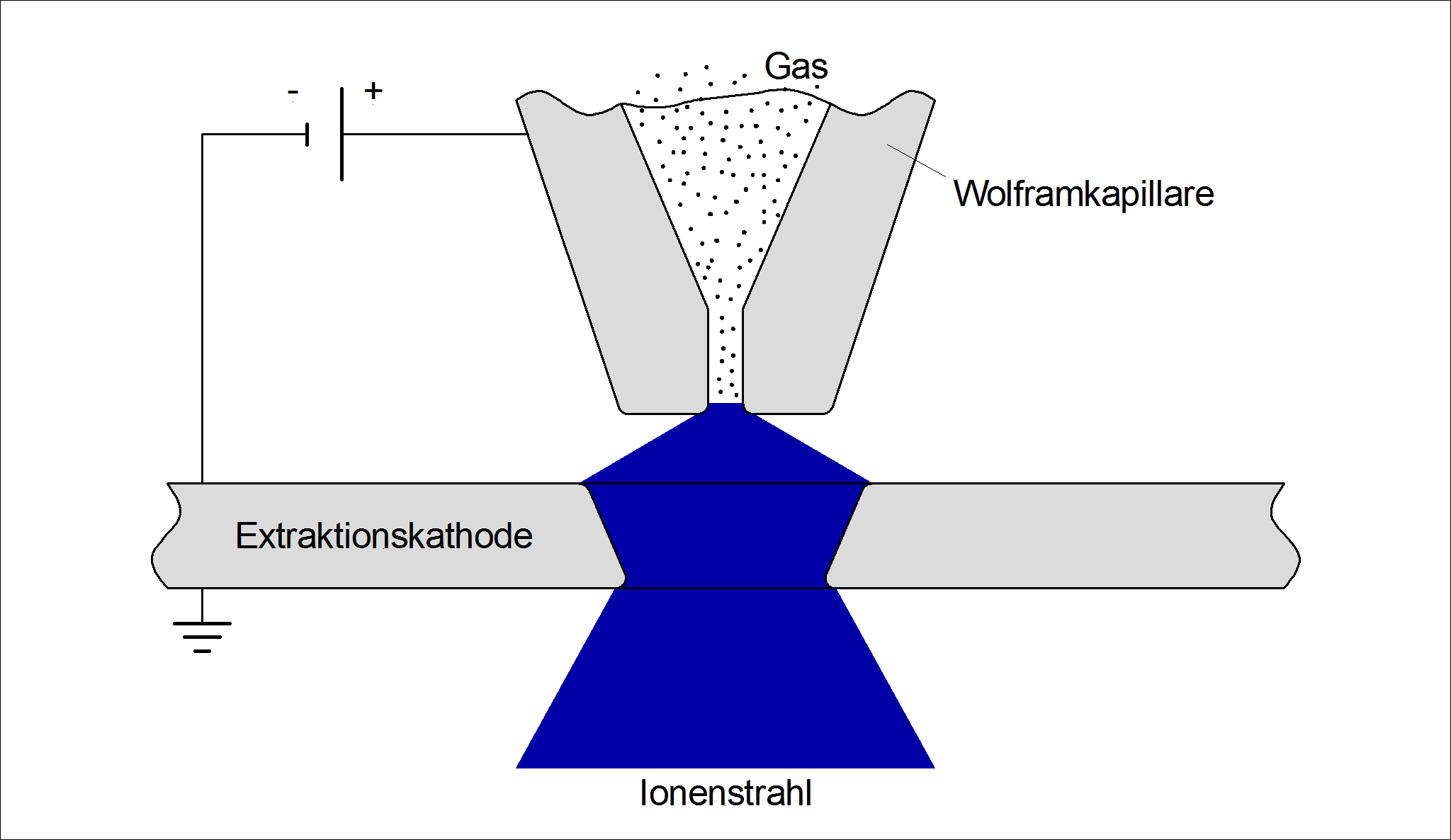
Capillaritron with tungsten capillary

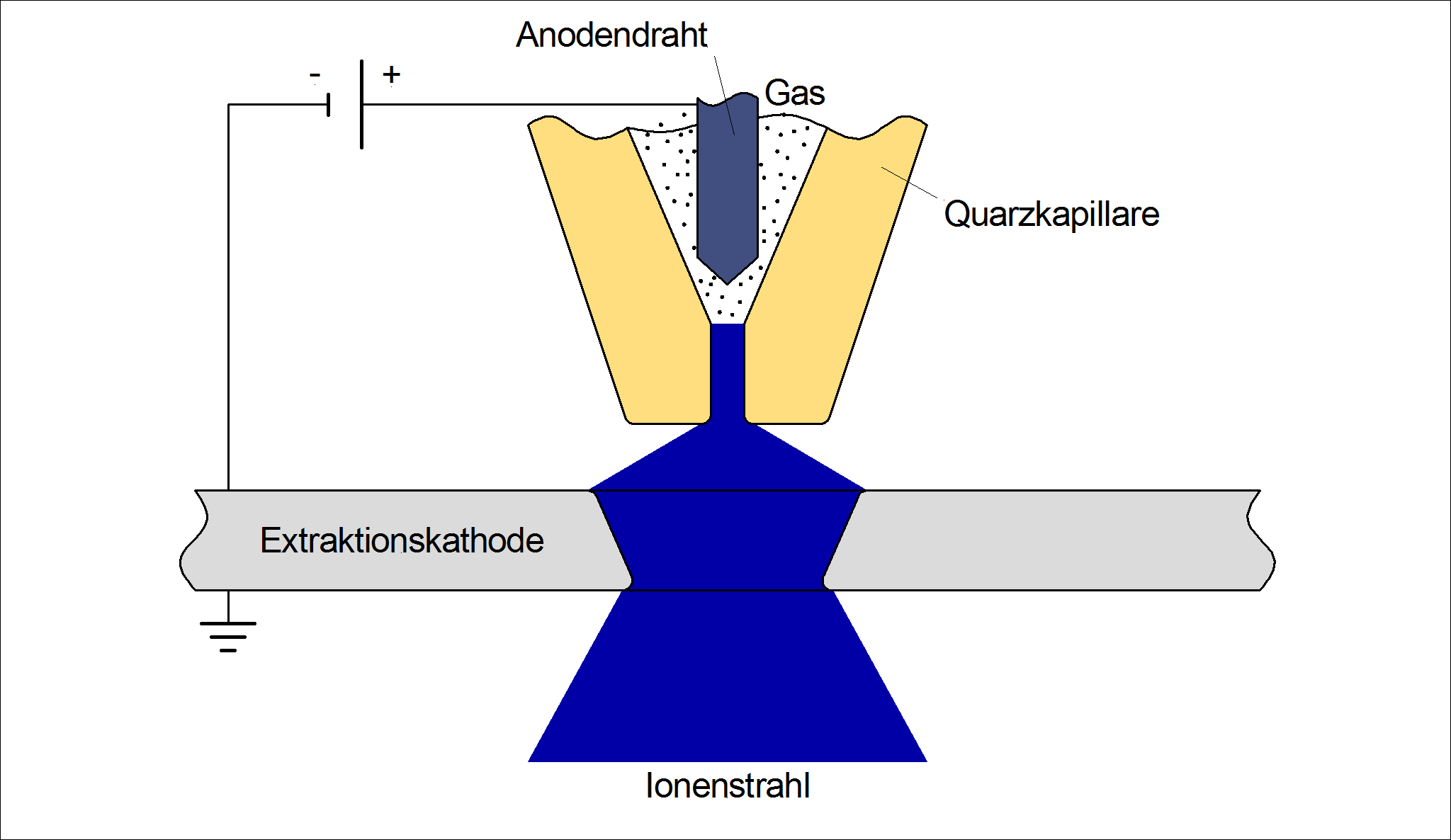
Capillaritron with quartz capillary

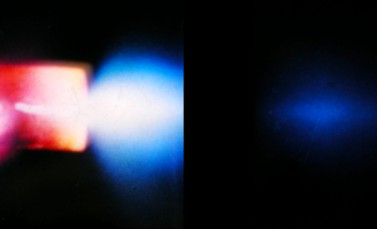
Capillaritron with quartz capillary in operation within a vacuum chamber: On the left the glowing capillary with the plasma up to the extraction cathode and on the right behind it the bluish glowing ion beam.

The capillaritron, the basic concept of which was published in 1981, consists of a fine metal capillary through which gas flows as an anode and a concentric extraction cathode with an outlet opening. A flow of gas through the capillary is extracted when high voltage (usually a few kilovolts) is ionised by free electrons and secondary electrons, which are accelerated towards the anode (see also impact ionisation). The positively charged ions are accelerated in the electric field and form an ion beam behind the opening of the extraction cathode. Due to recombination and charge exchange processes in the plasma, the beam also partly consists of uncharged atoms.

The capillary usually consists of resistant materials, such as tungsten. A further development from 1992 is the quartz capillaritron. Here the capillary consists of quartz, an electrically insulating material, into which a metal wire is inserted in order to generate the anode potential. The advantage lies in the simpler, more flexible and cheaper production of quartz capillaries with a predetermined inner diameter, which, unlike metal capillaries, do not have to be drilled but can be electrochemically etched or manufactured by a glassblower.

As a rule, inert gas is used as operating gas, as this only undergoes a minor chemical reaction with the other materials involved. However, a capillaritron also works with hydrogen, with nitrogen or even with air.

With ion beams of capillaritrons, current densities of up to 10 kiloamperes per square millimetre and beam currents of several milliamperes are achieved.

Through focusing with ion optics, beams with high power density can be generated in high vacuum, which can also be used to process surfaces selectively.

== Applications ==
Capillaritrons are commercially available.

Ion and atom beams can be used to sputter surfaces over large areas, and the sputtered material can be used for thin film deposition. Atomic beams can also be used to process insulating surfaces. When using ion beams, such surfaces would become more electrostatically charged, which slows down the ions before they hit the surface.

Furthermore, the capillaritron as an atom source can be used for mass spectrometry.

Capillaritrons are also suited for accelerator applications.
