= Electron ionization =

Ionization technique

Electron ionization

Electron ionization (EI, formerly known as electron impact ionization and electron bombardment ionization) is an ionization method in which energetic electrons interact with solid or gas phase atoms or molecules to produce ions. EI was one of the first ionization techniques developed for mass spectrometry. However, this method is still a popular ionization technique. This technique is considered a hard (high fragmentation) ionization method, since it uses highly energetic electrons to produce ions. This leads to extensive fragmentation, which can be helpful for structure determination of unknown compounds. EI is the most useful for organic compounds which have a molecular weight below 600 amu. Also, several other thermally stable and volatile compounds in solid, liquid and gas states can be detected with the use of this technique when coupled with various separation methods.

== History ==
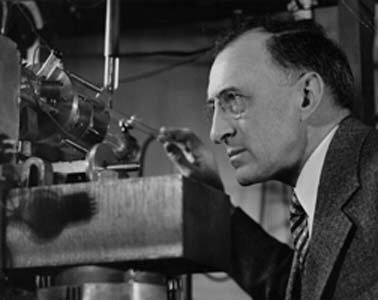
Arthur J. Dempster

Electron ionization was first described in 1918 by Canadian-American Physicist Arthur J. Dempster in the article of "A new method of positive ray analysis." It was the first modern mass spectrometer and used positive rays to determine the ratio of the mass to charge of various constituents. In this method, the ion source used an electron beam directed at a solid surface. The anode was made cylindrical in shape using the metal which was to be studied. Subsequently, it was heated by a concentric coil and then was bombarded with electrons. Using this method, the two isotopes of lithium and three isotopes of magnesium, with their atomic weights and relative proportions, were able to be determined. Since then this technique has been used with further modifications and developments. The use of a focused monoenergetic beam of electrons for ionization of gas phase atoms and molecules was developed by Bleakney in 1929.

== Principle of operation ==
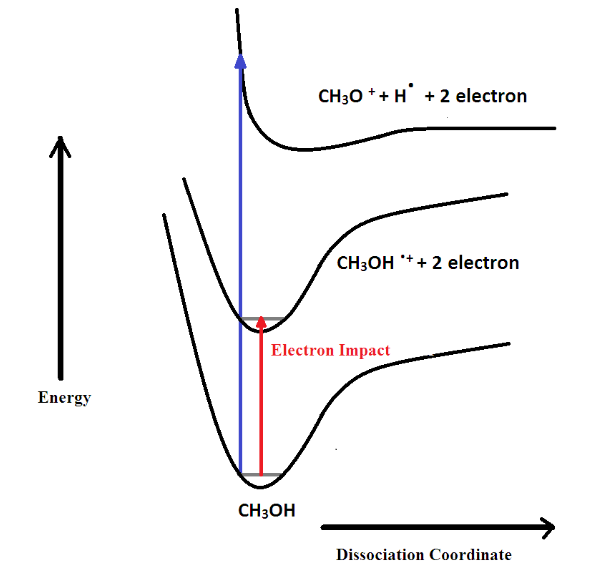
Electron Ionization of Methanol - Born Oppenheimer Potential Curves

In this process, an electron from the analyte molecule (M) is expelled during the collision process to convert the molecule to a positive ion with an odd number of electrons. The following gas phase reaction describes the electron ionization process

$$\ce{M{} + e^- -> M^{+\bullet}{} + 2e^-}$$

where M is the analyte molecule being ionized, e^{−} is the electron and M^{+•} is the resulting molecular ion.

In an EI ion source, electrons are produced through thermionic emission by heating a wire filament that has electric current running through it. The kinetic energy of the bombarding electrons should have higher energy than the ionization energy of the sample molecule. The electrons are accelerated to 70 eV in the region between the filament and the entrance to the ion source block. The sample under investigation which contains the neutral molecules is introduced to the ion source in a perpendicular orientation to the electron beam. Close passage of highly energetic electrons in low pressure (ca. 10^{−5} to 10^{−6} torr) causes large fluctuations in the electric field around the neutral molecules and induces ionization and fragmentation. The fragmentation in electron ionization can be described using Born Oppenheimer potential curves as in the diagram. The red arrow shows the electron impact energy which is enough to remove an electron from the analyte and form a molecular ion from non- dissociative results. Due to the higher energy supplied by 70 eV electrons other than the molecular ion, several other bond dissociation reactions can be seen as dissociative results, shown by the blue arrow in the diagram. These ions are known as second-generation product ions. The radical cation products are then directed towards the mass analyzer by a repeller electrode. The ionization process often follows predictable cleavage reactions that give rise to fragment ions which, following detection and signal processing, convey structural information about the analyte.

=== The efficiency of EI ===
Increasing the electron ionization process is done by increasing the ionization efficiency. In order to achieve higher ionization efficiency there should be an optimized filament current, emission current, and ionizing current. The current supplied to the filament to heat it to incandescent is called the filament current. The emission current is the current measured between the filament and the electron entry slit. The ionizing current is the rate of electron arrival at the trap. It is a direct measure of the number of electrons in the chamber that are available for ionization.

The sample ion current (I^{+}) is the measure of the ionization rate. This can be enhanced by manipulation of the ion extraction efficiency (β), the total ionizing cross section (Q_{i}), the effective ionizing path length (L), the concentration of the sample molecules([N]) and the ionizing current (I_{e}). The equation can be shown as follows:

$$I^+=\beta Q_iL [\ce N] I_e$$

The ion extraction efficiency (β) can be optimized by increasing the voltage of both repeller and acceleration. Since the ionization cross section depends on the chemical nature of the sample and the energy of ionizing electrons a standard value of 70 eV is used. At low energies (around 20 eV), the interactions between the electrons and the analyte molecules do not transfer enough energy to cause ionization. At around 70 eV, the de Broglie wavelength of the electrons matches the length of typical bonds in organic molecules (about 0.14 nm) and energy transfer to organic analyte molecules is maximized, leading to the strongest possible ionization and fragmentation. Under these conditions, about 1 in 1000 analyte molecules in the source are ionized. At higher energies, the de Broglie wavelength of the electrons becomes smaller than the bond lengths in typical analytes; the molecules then become "transparent" to the electrons and ionization efficiency decreases. The effective ionizing path length (L) can be increased by using a weak magnetic field. But the most practical way to increase the sample current is to operate the ion source at higher ionizing current (I_{e}).

== Instrumentation ==
Scheme of electron ionization instrumentation

A schematic diagram of instrumentation which can be used for electron ionization is shown to the right. The ion source block is made out of metal. As the electron source, the cathode, which can be a thin filament of tungsten or rhenium wire, is inserted through a slit to the source block. Then it is heated up to an incandescent temperature to emit electrons. A potential of 70 V is applied between the cathode and source block to accelerate them to 70 eV kinetic energy to produce positive ions. The potential of the anode (electron trap) is slightly positive and it is placed on the outside of the ionization chamber, directly opposite to the cathode. The unused electrons are collected by this electron trap. The sample is introduced through the sample hole. To increase the ionization process, a weak magnetic field is applied parallel to the direction of the electrons' travel. Because of this, electrons travel in a narrow helical path, which increases their path length. The positive ions that are generated are accelerated by the repeller electrode into the accelerating region through the slit in the source block. By applying a potential to the ion source and maintaining the exit slit at ground potential, ions enter the mass analyzer with a fixed kinetic energy. To avoid the condensation of the sample, the source block is heated to approximately 300 °C.

== Applications ==
Since the early 20th century electron ionization has been one of the most popular ionization techniques because of the large number of applications it has. These applications can be broadly categorized by the method of sample insertion used. The gaseous and highly volatile liquid samples use a vacuum manifold, solids and less volatile liquids use a direct insertion probe, and complex mixtures use gas chromatography or liquid chromatography.

=== Vacuum manifold ===
In this method the sample is first inserted into a heated sample reservoir in the vacuum manifold. It then escapes into the ionization chamber through a pinhole. This method is useful with highly volatile samples that may not be compatible with other sample introduction methods.

=== Direct insertion EI-MS ===
In this method, the probe is manufactured from a long metal channel which ends in a well for holding a sample capillary. The probe is inserted into the source block through a vacuum lock. The sample is introduced to the well using a glass capillary. Next the probe is quickly heated to the desired temperature to vaporize the sample. Using this probe the sample can be positioned very close to the ionization region.

==== Analysis of archaeologic materials ====
Direct insertion electron ionization mass spectrometry (direct insertion EI-MS) has been used for the identification of archeological adhesives such as tars, resins and waxes found during excavations on archeological sites. These samples are typically investigated using gas chromatography–MS with extraction, purification, and derivatization of the samples. Due to the fact that these samples were deposited in prehistoric periods, they are often preserved in small amounts. By using direct insertion EI–MS archaeological samples, ancient organic remains like pine and pistacia resins, birch bark tar, beeswax, and plant oils as far from bronze and Iron Age periods were directly analyzed. The advantage of this technique is that the required amount of sample is less and the sample preparation is minimized.

Both direct insertion-MS and gas chromatography-MS were used and compared in a study of characterization of the organic material present as coatings in Roman and Egyptian amphoras can be taken as an example of archeological resinous materials. From this study, it reveals that, the direct insertion procedure seems to be a fast, straightforward and a unique tool which is suitable for screening of organic archeological materials which can reveal information about the major constituents within the sample. This method provides information on the degree of oxidation and the class of materials present. As a drawback of this method, less abundant components of the sample may not be identified.

==== Characterization of synthetic carbon clusters ====
Another application of direct insertion EI-MS is the characterization of novel synthetic carbon clusters isolated in the solid phase. These crystalline materials consist of C_{60} and C_{70} in the ratio of 37:1. In one investigation it has been shown that the synthetic C_{60} molecule is remarkably stable and that it retains its aromatic character.

=== Gas chromatography mass spectrometry ===
Gas chromatography (GC) is the most widely used method in EI-MS for sample insertion. GC can be incorporated for the separation of mixtures of thermally stable and volatile gases which are in perfect match with the electron ionization conditions.

==== Analysis of archaeologic materials ====
The GC-EI-MS has been used for the study and characterization of organic material present in coatings on Roman and Egyptian amphorae. From this analysis scientists found that the material used to waterproof the amphorae was a particular type of resin not native to the archaeological site but imported from another region. One disadvantage of this method was the long analysis time and requirement of wet chemical pre-treatment.

==== Environmental analysis ====
GC-EI-MS has been successfully used for the determination of pesticide residues in fresh food by a single injection analysis. In this analysis 81 multi-class pesticide residues were identified in vegetables. For this study the pesticides were extracted with dichloromethane and further analyzed using gas chromatography–tandem mass spectrometry (GC–MS–MS). The optimum ionization method can be identified as EI or chemical ionization (CI) for this single injection of the extract. This method is fast, simple and cost effective since high numbers of pesticides can be determined by GC with a single injection, considerably reducing the total time for the analysis.

==== Analysis of biological fluids ====
The GC-EI-MS can be incorporated for the analysis of biological fluids for several applications. One example is the determination of thirteen synthetic pyrethroid insecticide molecules and their stereoisomers in whole blood. This investigation used a new rapid and sensitive electron ionization-gas chromatography–mass spectrometry method in selective ion monitoring mode (SIM) with a single injection of the sample. All the pyrethroid residues were separated by using a GC-MS operated in electron ionization mode and quantified in selective ion monitoring mode. The detection of specific residues in blood is a difficult task due to their very low concentration since as soon as they enter the body most of the chemicals may get excreted. However, this method detected the residues of different pyrethroids down to the level 0.05–2 ng/ml. The detection of this insecticide in blood is very important since an ultra-small quantity in the body is enough to be harmful to human health, especially in children. This method is a very simple, rapid technique and therefore can be adopted without any matrix interferences. The selective ion monitoring mode provides detection sensitivity up to 0.05 ng/ml. Another application is in protein turnover studies using GC-EI-MS. This measures very low levels of d-phenylalanine which can indicate the enrichment of amino acid incorporated into tissue protein during studies of human protein synthesis. This method is very efficient since both free and protein-bound d-phenylalanine can be measured using the same mass spectrometer and only a small amount of protein is needed (about 1 mg).

==== Forensic applications ====
The GC-EI-MS is also used in forensic science. One example is the analysis of five local anesthetics in blood using headspace solid-phase microextraction (HS-SPME) and gas chromatography–mass spectrometry–electron impact ionization selected ion monitoring (GC–MS–EI-SIM). Local anesthesia is widely used but sometimes these drugs can cause medical accidents. In such cases an accurate, simple, and rapid method for the analysis of local anesthetics is required. GC-EI-MS was used in one case with an analysis time of 65 minutes and a sample size of approximately 0.2 g, a relatively small amount. Another application in forensic practice is the determination of date rape drugs (DRDs) in urine. These drugs are used to incapacitate victims and then rape or rob them. The analyses of these drugs are difficult due to the low concentrations in the body fluids and often a long time delay between the event and clinical examination. However, using GC-EI-MS allows a simple, sensitive and robust method for the identification, detection and quantification of 128 compounds of DRDs in urine.

=== Liquid chromatography EI-MS ===
Two recent approaches for coupling capillary scale liquid chromatography-electron ionization mass spectrometry (LC-EI-MS) can be incorporated for the analysis of various samples. These are capillary-scale EI-based LC/MS interface and direct-EI interface. In the capillary EI the nebulizer has been optimized for linearity and sensitivity. The direct-EI interface is a miniaturized interface for nano- and micro-HPLC in which the interfacing process takes place in a suitably modified ion source. Higher sensitivity, linearity, and reproducibility can be obtained because the elution from the column is completely transferred into the ion source. Using these two interfaces electron ionization can be successfully incorporated for the analysis of small and medium-sized molecules with various polarities. The most common applications for these interfaces in LC-MS are environmental applications such as gradient separations of the pesticides, carbaryl, propanil, and chlorpropham using a reversed phase, and pharmaceutical applications such as separation of four anti-inflammatory drugs, diphenyldramine, amitriptyline, naproxen, and ibuprofen.

Another method to categorize the applications of electron ionization is based on the separation technique which is used in mass spectroscopy. According to this category most of the time applications can be found in time of flight (TOF) or orthogonal TOF mass spectrometry (OA-TOF MS), Fourier transform ion cyclotron resonance (FT-ICR MS) and quadrupole or ion trap mass spectrometry.

=== Use with time-of-flight mass spectrometry ===
The electron ionization time of flight mass spectroscopy (EI-TOF MS) is well suited for analytical and basic chemical physics studies. EI-TOF MS is used to find ionization potentials of molecules and radicals, as well as bond dissociation energies for ions and neutral molecules. Another use of this method is to study about negative ion chemistry and physics. Autodetachment lifetimes, metastable dissociation, Rydberg electron transfer reactions and field detachment, SF6 scavenger method for detecting temporary negative ion states, and many others have all been discovered using this technique. In this method the field free ionization region allows for high precision in the electron energy and also high electron energy resolution. Measuring the electric fields down the ion flight tube determines autodetachment and metastable decomposition as well as field detachment of weakly bound negative ions.

The first description of an electron ionization orthogonal-acceleration TOF MS (EI oa-TOFMS) was in 1989. By using "orthogonal-acceleration" with the EI ion source the resolving power and sensitivity was increased. One of the key advantage of oa-TOFMS with EI sources is for deployment with gas chromatographic (GC) inlet systems, which allows chromatographic separation of volatile organic compounds to proceed at high speed.

=== Fourier transform ion cyclotron resonance mass spectrometry ===
FT- ICR EI - MS can be used for analysis of three vacuum gas oil (VGO) distillation fractions in 295-319 °C, 319-456 °C and 456-543 °C. In this method, EI at 10 eV allows soft ionization of aromatic compounds in the vacuum gas oil range. The compositional variations at the molecular level were determined from the elemental composition assignment. Ultra-high resolving power, small sample size, high reproducibility and mass accuracy (<0.4ppm) are the special features in this method. The major product was aromatic hydrocarbons in all three samples. In addition, many sulfur-, nitrogen-, and oxygen-containing compounds were directly observed when the concentration of this heteroatomic species increased with the boiling point. Using data analysis it gave the information about compound types (rings plus double bonds), their carbon number distributions for hydrocarbon and heteroatomic compounds in the distillation fractions, increasing average molecular weight (or carbon number distribution) and aromaticity with increasing boiling temperature of the petroleum fractions.

=== Ion trap mass spectrometry ===
Ion trap EI MS can be incorporated for the identification and quantitation of nonylphenol polyethoxylate (NPEO) residues and their degradation products such as nonylphenol polyethoxy carboxylates and carboxyalkylphenol ethoxy carboxylates, in the samples of river water and sewage effluent. Form this research, they have found out that the ion trap GC- MS is a reliable and convenient analytical approach with variety of ionization methods including EI, for the determination of target compounds in environmental samples.

== Advantages and disadvantages ==
There are several advantages and also disadvantages by using EI as the ionization method in mass spectrometry. These are listed below.

Advantages	Disadvantages
Simple	Molecule must be volatile
Sensitive	molecule must be thermally stable
Fragmentation helps with identification of molecules	Extensive fragmentation- can't interpret data
Library-searchable fingerprint spectra	Useful mass range is low (<1000 Da)

== See also ==
- Ion source
- Penning ionization
- Chemical ionization
- Spark ionization
- Thermal ionization

== Notes ==
- Edmond de Hoffman; Vincent Stroobant (2001). Mass Spectrometry: Principles and Applications (2nd ed.). John Wiley and Sons. ISBN 978-0-471-48566-7.
- Stephen J. Schrader (2001). Interpretation of Electron Ionization Data: The Odd Book. Not Avail. ISBN 978-0-9660813-6-7.
- Peterkops, Raimonds (1977). Theory of ionization of atoms by electron impact. Boulder, Colo: Colorado Associated University Press. ISBN 978-0-87081-105-0.
- Electron impact ionization. Berlin: Springer-Verlag. 1985. ISBN 978-0-387-81778-1.
