= 1956 United States Army aircraft designation system =

The 1956 United States Army designation system was introduced by the United States Army to replace the designation system used by the United States Army Air Corps which had become the United States Air Force in 1948. It was used until the unified tri-service designation system for all services came into effect.

== List of designations and use ==
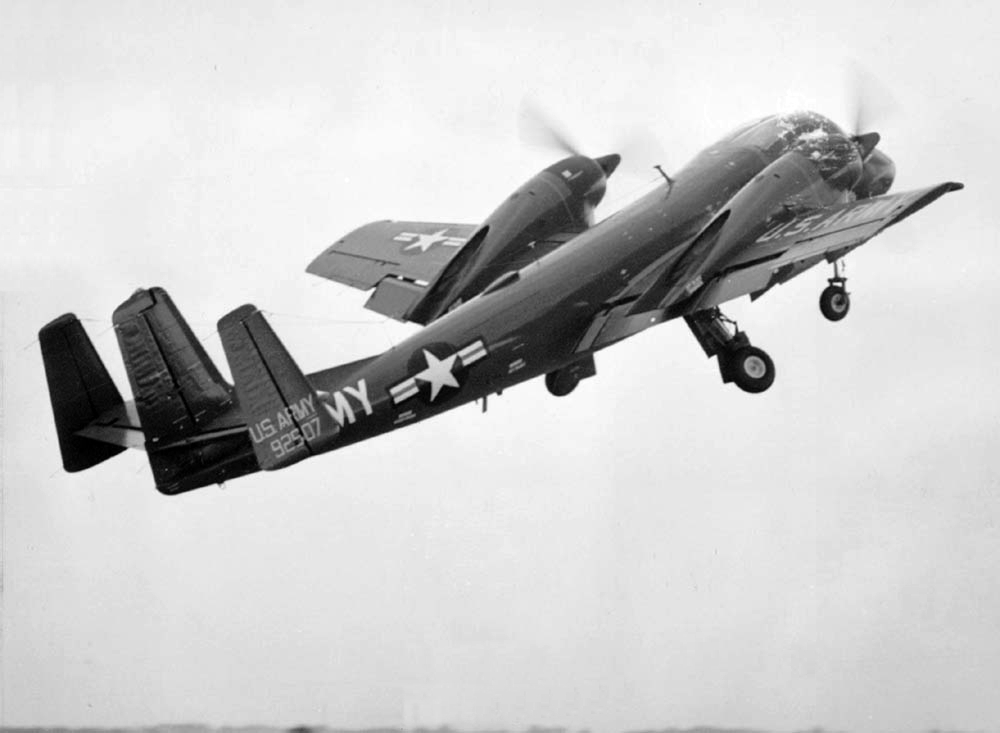
AO-1 Mohawk

In 1956, the U.S. Army adopted a new, and relatively simple, designation system for its aviation assets. Aircraft were divided into three different types – 'A' for fixed-wing aircraft, 'H' for helicopters, or 'V' for V/STOL aircraft, and then were given a mission modifier, which, unlike the USAF system, came after the type code: 'C' for transports, 'O' for observation and reconnaissance aircraft, 'U' for utility types, and 'Z' for experimental aircraft. Aircraft types designated in this system were numbered sequentially. For more information on the designation system, see 1956 United States Army aircraft designation system.

=== AC: Airplane, Cargo (1956–1962) ===
- AC-1 Caribou – de Havilland Canada (redesignated CV-2 in 1962)
- AC-2 Buffalo – de Havilland Canada (redesignated CV-7 in 1962)

=== AO: Airplane, Observation (1956–1962) ===
- AO-1 Mohawk – Grumman (redesignated OV-1 in 1962)
- AO-2 Inflatoplane – Goodyear
- AO-3 Inflatoplane – Goodyear

=== AU: Airplane, Utility (1956–1962) ===
- AU-1 – de Havilland Canada (redesignated U-1 in 1962)

=== HC: Helicopter, Cargo (1956–1962) ===
- HC-1 Sea Knight – Boeing Vertol (redesignated H-46 in 1962)
  - HC-1B Chinook – Boeing Vertol (redesignated H-47 in 1962)

=== HO: Flying Platform (1956–1956) ===
- HO-1 Pawnee – Hiller (redesignated VZ-1 in 1956)
- HO-2 – de Lackner (redesignated HZ-1 in 1956)

=== HO: Helicopter, Observation (1956–1962) ===
- HO-1 – SNCASO
- HO-2 – Hughes
- HO-3 – Brantly
- HO-4 – Bell (redesignated H-4 in 1962)
- HO-5 – Fairchild Hiller (redesignated H-5 in 1962)
- HO-6 – Hughes (redesignated H-6 in 1962)

=== HU: Helicopter, Utility (1956–1962) ===
- HU-1 Iroquois – Bell (redesignated H-1 in 1962)

=== HZ: Helicopter, Experimental (1956–1962) ===
- HZ-1 Aerocycle – de Lackner Helicopters

=== VZ: Vertical Takeoff and Landing Research (1956–1962) ===
- VZ-1 Pawnee – Hiller
- VZ-2 – Vertol
- VZ-3 Vertiplane – Ryan
- VZ-4 Convertiplane – Doak
- VZ-5 Fledgling – Fairchild
- VZ-6 – Chrysler
- VZ-7 – Curtiss-Wright
- VZ-8 Airgeep – Piasecki
- VZ-9 Avrocar – Avro Canada
- VZ-10 Hummingbird – Lockheed (redesignated V-4 in 1962)
- VZ-11 Vertifan – Ryan (redesignated as V-5 in 1962)
- VZ-12 Kestrel – Hawker Siddeley (redesignated as V-6 in 1962)

== See also ==
- United States military aircraft designation systems

== Sources ==
- Andrade, John (1979). U.S.Military Aircraft Designations and Serials since 1909. Midland Counties Publications. ISBN 0-904597-22-9.
