= GFS =

GFS may refer to:

== Businesses and organisations ==
- GFS Projects (Geoff's Flying Saucer), a British aerospace company
- Girls' Friendly Society, a charity in the UK
- GlobalFoundries (Nasdaq: GFS), an American semiconductor manufacturing company
- Government Flying Service, Hong Kong
- Gordon Food Service, North America
- Greek Font Society
- Groupe Feministe Socialiste, a defunct French feminist group

== Computing ==
- GFS2 (Global File System 2), in Linux
- Global Forecast System, American weather prediction system
- Google File System
- Grandfather-father-son, a backup rotation scheme

== Education ==
- Garrison Forest School, in Owing Mills, Maryland, US
- Germantown Friends School, in Philadelphia, Pennsylvania, US
- Ghetto Film School, in New York, Los Angeles, and London
- Griffith Film School, in Brisbane, Australia

== Other uses ==
- Genome-based peptide fingerprint scanning
- Glucose-fructose syrup, another name for high-fructose corn syrup
- Grounds For Sculpture, sculpture park and museum located in Hamilton, New Jersey, United States

== See also ==
- GF (disambiguation)
