= Metaproteomics =

Study of all proteins in an environment

Metaproteomics (also community proteomics, environmental proteomics, or community proteogenomics) is an umbrella term for experimental approaches to study all proteins in microbial communities and microbiomes from environmental sources. Metaproteomics is used to classify experiments that deal with all proteins identified and quantified from complex microbial communities. Metaproteomics approaches are comparable to gene-centric environmental genomics, or metagenomics.

== Origin of the term ==
The term "metaproteomics" was proposed by Francisco Rodríguez-Valera to describe the genes and/or proteins most abundantly expressed in environmental samples. The term was derived from "metagenome". Wilmes and Bond proposed the term "metaproteomics" for the large-scale characterization of the entire protein complement of environmental microbiota at a given point in time. At the same time, the terms "microbial community proteomics" and "microbial community proteogenomics" are sometimes used interchangeably for different types of experiments and results.

== Questions addressed by metaproteomics ==
Metaproteomics allows for scientists to better understand organisms' gene functions, as genes in DNA are transcribed to mRNA which is then translated to protein. Gene expression changes can therefore be monitored through this method. Furthermore, proteins represent cellular activity and structure, so using metaproteomics in research can lead to functional information at the molecular level. Metaproteomics can also be used as a tool to assess the composition of a microbial community in terms of biomass contributions of individual members species in the community and can thus complement approaches that assess community composition based on gene copy counts such as 16S rRNA gene amplicon or metagenome sequencing.

== Proteomics of microbial communities ==
The first proteomics experiment was conducted with the invention of two-dimensional polyacrylamide gel electrophoresis (2D-PAGE). The 1980s and 1990s saw the development of mass spectrometry and mass spectrometry based proteomics. The current proteomics of microbial community makes use of both gel-based (one-dimensional and two-dimensional) and non-gel liquid chromatography based separation, where both rely on mass spectrometry based peptide identification.

While proteomics is largely a discovery-based approach that is followed by other molecular or analytical techniques to provide a full picture of the subject system, it is not limited to simple cataloging of proteins present in a sample. With the combined capabilities of "top-down" and "bottom-up" approaches, proteomics can pursue inquiries ranging from quantitation of gene expression between growth conditions (whether nutritional, spatial, temporal, or chemical) to protein structural information.

A metaproteomics study of the human oral microbiome found 50 bacterial genera using shotgun proteomics. The results agreed with the Human Microbiome Project, a metagenomic based approach.

Similarly, metaproteomics approaches have been used in larger clinical studies linking the bacterial proteome with human health. A recent paper used shotgun proteomics to characterize the vaginal microbiome, identifying 188 unique bacterial species in 688 women profiled. This study linked vaginal microbiome groups to the efficacy of topical antiretroviral drugs to prevent HIV acquisition in women, which was attributed to bacterial metabolism of the drug in vivo. In addition, metaproteomic approaches have been used to study other aspects of the vaginal microbiome, including the immunological and inflammatory consequences of vaginal microbial dysbiosis, as well as the influence of hormonal contraceptives on the vaginal microbiome.

== Metaproteomics and the human intestinal microbiome ==
Aside from the oral and vaginal microbiomes, several intestinal microbiome studies have used metaproteomic approaches. A 2020 study done by Long et al. has shown, using metaproteomic approaches, that colorectal cancer pathogenesis may be due to changes in the intestinal microbiome. Several proteins examined in this study were associated with iron intake and transport as well as oxidative stress, as high intestinal iron content and oxidative stress are indicative of colorectal cancer.

Another study done in 2017 by Xiong et al. used metaproteomics along with metagenomics in analyzing gut microbiome changes during human development. Xiong et al. found that the infant gut microbiome may be initially populated with facultative anaerobes such as Enterococcus and Klebsiella, and then later populated by obligate anaerobes like Clostridium, Bifidobacterium, and Bacteroides. While the human gut microbiome shifted over time, microbial metabolic functions remained consistent, including carbohydrate, amino acid and nucleotide metabolism.

A similar study done in 2017 by Maier et al. combined metaproteomics with metagenomics and metabolomics to show the effects of resistant starch on the human intestinal microbiome. After subjects consumed diets high in resistant starch, it was discovered that several microbial proteins were altered such as butyrate kinase, enoyl coenzyme A (enoyl-CoA) hydratase, phosphotransacetylase, adenylosuccinate synthase, adenine phosphoribosyltransferases, and guanine phosphoribosyltransferases. The human subjects experienced increases in colipase, pancreatic triglyceride lipase, bile salt-stimulated lipase abundance while also experiencing a decrease in α-amylase. Metaproteomics has also been used to understand the human-microbiome interactions that may underlie cardiovascular health. Using machine learning, a 2025 study by Yang et al. showed that human and microbial proteins could identify those at high-risk of cardiovascular disease in healthy and heart failure cohorts. These were proteins were primarily associated with intestinal inflammation and production of short-chain fatty acids.

Overall, metaproteomics has gained immense popularity in human intestinal microbiome studies as it has led to important discoveries in the health field.

== Metaproteomics in environmental microbiome studies ==
Metaproteomics has been especially useful in the identification of microbes involved in various biodegradation processes. A 2017 study done by Jia et al. has shown the application of metaproteomics in examining protein expression profiles of biofuel-producing microorganisms. According to this study, bacterial and archaeal proteins are involved in producing hydrogen and methane-derived biofuels. Bacterial proteins involved are ferredoxin-NADP reductase, acetate kinase, and NADH-quinone oxidoreductase found in the Firmicutes, Proteobacteria, Actinobacteria and Bacteroidetes taxa. These particular proteins are involved in carbohydrate, lipid, and amino acid metabolism. The archaeal proteins involved are acetyl-CoA decarboxylase and methyl-coenzyme M reductase found in Methanosarcina. These proteins participate in biochemical pathways involving acetic acid utilization, CO_{2} reduction, and methyl nutrient usage.

The first quantification method for metaproteomics was reported by Laloo et al. 2018 on an engineered biological reactor enriched for ammonia and nitrite oxidising bacteria. Here the authors used a robust SWATH-MS quantification method ( protein requirement 5μg) for studying the change in expression levels of protein to a perturbed condition. The study noted that the changes in protein expression of the dominant species i.e. ammonia oxidising bacteria were clearly observed but this was not so for the nitrite oxidising bacteria which was found in low abundance.

A 2019 study by Li et al. has demonstrated the use of metaproteomics in observing protein expression of polycyclic aromatic hydrocarbon (PAH) degradation genes. The authors of this study specifically focused on identifying the degradable microbial communities in activated sludge during wastewater treatment, as PAHs are highly prevalent wastewater pollutants. They showed that Burkholderiales bacteria are heavily involved in PAH degradation, and that the bacterial proteins are involved in DNA replication, fatty acid and glucose metabolism, stress response, protein synthesis, and aromatic hydrocarbon metabolism.

A similar study done in 2020 by Zhang et al. involved metaproteomic profiling of azo dye-degrading microorganisms. As azo dyes are hazardous industrial pollutants, metaproteomics was used to observe the overall biodegradation mechanism. Pseudomonas Burkholderia, Enterobacter, Lactococcus and Clostridium strains were identified using metagenomic shotgun sequencing, and many bacterial proteins were found to show degradative activity. These proteins identified using metaproteomics include those involved in the TCA cycle, glycolysis, and aldehyde dehydrogenation. Identification of these proteins therefore led the scientists into proposing potential azo dye degradation pathways in Pseudomonas and Burkholderia.

All in all, metaproteomics is applicable not only to human health studies, but also to environmental studies involving potentially harmful contaminants.

== See also ==
- Metatranscriptomics
