= Mowse =

Mowse may refer to:

- William Mowse (died 1588), an English lawyer and Master of Trinity Hall, Cambridge
- a DC comic character

MOWSE may refer to:

- MOWSE, a method for identification of proteins from the molecular weight of peptides created by proteolytic digestion
