= Missile gap =

Cold War term used in the United States

In the United States, during the Cold War, the missile gap was the perceived superiority of the number and power of the USSR's missiles in comparison with those of the U.S., causing a lack of military parity. The gap in the ballistic missile arsenals did not exist except in exaggerated estimates, made by the Gaither Committee in 1957 and in United States Air Force (USAF) figures. Even the contradictory CIA figures for the USSR's weaponry, which showed a clear advantage for the US, were far above the actual count. Like the bomber gap of only a few years earlier, it was soon demonstrated that the gap was entirely fictional.

John F. Kennedy is credited with inventing the term in 1958 as part of the ongoing election campaign in which a primary plank of his rhetoric was that the Eisenhower administration was weak on defense. It was later learned that Kennedy was informed of the actual situation during the campaign, which has led scholars to question what Kennedy knew and when he knew it. There has been some speculation that he was aware of the illusory nature of the missile gap from the start and that he was using it solely as a political tool, an example of policy by press release.

== Background ==
The Soviet launch of Sputnik 1, on October 4, 1957, highlighted the technological achievements of the Soviets and sparked some worrying questions for the politicians and general public of the US. Although US military and civilian agencies were well aware of Soviet satellite plans, as they were publicly announced as part of the International Geophysical Year, US President Dwight Eisenhower's announcements that the event was unsurprising found little support among the American public. Nikita Khrushchev asserted that long-range missiles were rolling off the assembly line "like sausages", a bluff that contributed to the perception of a missile gap.

Political opponents seized on the event, helped by Eisenhower's ineffectual response, as further proof that the US was "fiddling as Rome burned". Senator John F. Kennedy stated "the nation was losing the satellite-missile race with the Soviet Union because of ... complacent miscalculations, penny-pinching, budget cutbacks, incredibly confused mismanagement, and wasteful rivalries and jealousies." The Soviets capitalized on their strengthened position with false claims of Soviet missile capabilities, claiming on December 4, 1958, that "Soviet ICBMs are at present in mass production." Five days later, Soviet Premier Nikita Khrushchev boasted the successful testing of an ICBM (Intercontinental Ballistic Missile) with an impressive 8,000-mile (13,000 km) range. Coupled with the US's failed launch of the Titan ICBM that month, a sense of Soviet superiority in missile technology became prevalent.

== Discrepancy between intelligence and information made public ==
National Intelligence Estimate (NIE) 11-10-57, issued in December 1957, predicted that the Soviets would "probably have a first operational capability with up to 10 prototype ICBMs" at "some time during the period from mid-1958 to mid-1959". The numbers started to inflate.

A similar report gathered only a few months later, NIE 11-5-58, released in August 1958, concluded that the USSR had "the technical and industrial capability ... to have an operational capability with 100 ICBMs" some time in 1960 and perhaps 500 ICBMs "some time in 1961, or at the latest in 1962".

However, senior U.S. leadership knew these estimates of existing Soviet missile capabilities were completely inaccurate. Beginning with the collection of photo-intelligence by high-altitude U-2 overflights of the Soviet Union in 1956, the Eisenhower administration had increasingly-hard evidence that strategic weapons estimates favoring the Soviets were false. The CIA placed the number of ICBMs to be closer to a dozen. Continued sporadic flights failed to turn up any evidence of additional missiles. But the White House and the CIA wished to protect the secrecy of the source of the information—the photographs captured by the U-2 flying in illegal violation of Soviet airspace—and so they continued to hide the more accurate information that there were nearly zero Soviet ICBMs deployed. They kept the American public in the dark even though they knew from the start that the Soviets were monitoring the U-2 overflights. On the very day of the first U-2 overflight the Soviet ambassador to Washington protested the high-altitude violation of Soviet airspace, a fact denied by Washington and reported on by the press.

Curtis LeMay argued that the large stocks of missiles were in the areas not photographed by the U-2s, and arguments broke out over the Soviet factory capability, in an effort to estimate their production rate.

In a widely syndicated article in 1959, Joseph Alsop even went so far as to describe "classified intelligence" as placing the Soviet missile count as high as 1,500 by 1963, while the US would have only 130 at that time.

It is known today that even the CIA's estimate was too high; the actual number of ICBMs, even including interim-use prototypes, was 4.

Although U2 intelligence programs provided unprecedented and reassuring evidence that there was a missile gap in favor of the United States, President Eisenhower's administration was accused of allowing the Soviet Union to accumulate a missile gap against the United States. The false claims behind a Soviet Missile gap began after CIA Director Allen W. Dulles presented new estimates of the Soviets' nuclear program to the National Security Council on January 7, 1960. The report presented by Dulles showed the Soviet Union did not have a crash program to build ICBMs and that they only had 50 ICBMs operational. Disagreements between the future capabilities of the Soviet Union to produce ICBMs by members of the National Security Council leaked to the public causing the false notion of a missile gap. As members of the National Security Council, representatives of the U.S. Air Force pessimistically estimated that the Soviet Union could possess more than 800 ICBMs by 1963. One week after the National Security Council meeting, Washington Post reporter, John G. Norris, published an article that selectively reported and misinterpreted highly classified information that claimed the National Security Council acknowledged a missile gap with the Soviets and that they would possess over 1000 ICBMs by 1963. Later that month, The New York Times would publish an article that claimed that there was "clear evidence that the Russians [had] superiority in intercontinental ballistic missiles". The distortions and inconsistencies caused by the inaccurate articles in the media led the public to mistrust the Eisenhower administration. Senator Symington accused the administration of "deliberately manipulating the intelligence estimate to mislead the public". Journalists, such as Joe Alsop, charged the Eisenhower administration with "gambling the nation's future" on questionable intelligence. Alsop’s ideas would appeal to John F. Kennedy who incorporated them in his election campaigns that criticized the Eisenhower administration for allowing a missile gap to exist.

== Political use ==
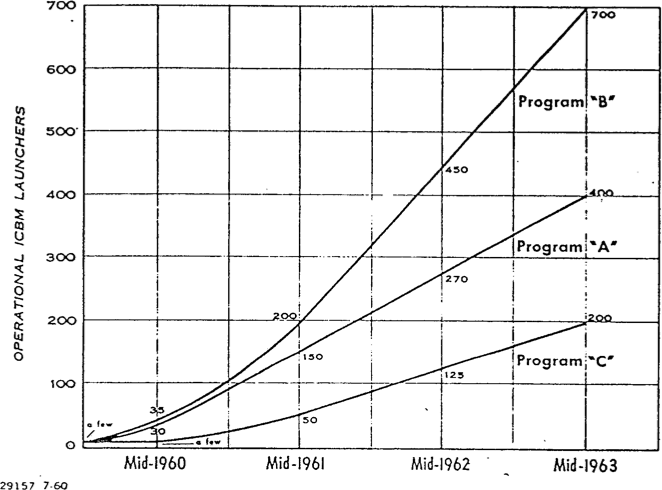
Projected numbers of Soviet ICBM (Program A: CIA, B: USAF, C: Army & Navy)

Hawkish members of Congress, such as Senator Stuart Symington, continued to beat the drums about the alleged missile gap in an effort to pressure the president to increase spending on military hardware. President Eisenhower resented being bullied based on inaccurate information and was beginning to formulate the term "military-industrial complex" to describe the close nexus between U.S. politicians and the defense industry.

In 1958, Kennedy was gearing up for his Senate re-election campaign and seized the issue. The Oxford English Dictionary lists the first use of the term "missile gap" on 14 August 1958, when he stated, "Our Nation could have afforded, and can afford now, the steps necessary to close the missile gap." According to Robert McNamara, Kennedy was leaked the inflated US Air Force estimates by Senator Stuart Symington, the former Secretary of the Air Force. Unaware that the report was misleading, Kennedy used the numbers in the document and based some of his 1960 election campaign platform on the Republicans being "weak on defense". The missile gap was a common theme.

Eisenhower refused to refute the claims publicly for fear that public disclosure would jeopardize the secret U-2 flights. Consequently, Eisenhower was frustrated by what he conclusively knew to be Kennedy's erroneous claims that the United States was behind the USSR in its number of missiles.

In an attempt to defuse the situation, Eisenhower arranged for Kennedy and Lyndon Johnson to be briefed on the information, first with a meeting by the Joint Chiefs of Staff, then Strategic Air Command, and finally with the Director of the CIA, Allen Dulles, in July 1960. Still, Kennedy continued to use the same rhetoric, which modern historians have debated as likely being so useful to the campaign that he was willing to ignore the truth.

In January 1961, McNamara, the new secretary of defense, and Roswell Gilpatric, a new deputy secretary, who strongly believed in the existence of a missile gap, personally examined photographs taken by Corona satellites. Although the Soviet R-7 missile launchers were large and would be easy to spot in Corona photographs, they did not appear in any of them. In February, McNamara stated that there was no evidence of a large-scale Soviet effort to build ICBMs. More satellite overflights continued to find no evidence, and by September 1961, a National Intelligence Estimate concluded that the USSR had no more than 25 ICBMs and would not possess more in the near future.

The missile gap was greatly in the US's favor. Satellite photographs showed the Soviets had 10 operational ICBMs, the US 57. According to Budiansky, the SS-6 and SS-7 missiles "took hours to fuel and had to have their unstable liquid propellant drained every thirty days to prevent them from blowing up on the launch pad; the new U.S. Minuteman missile, entering final testing, was powered by solid propellant and could be launched in minutes."

During a transition briefing, Jerome Wiesner, "a member of Eisenhower's permanent Science Advisory Committee, ... explained that the missile gap was a fiction. The new president greeted the news with a single expletive "delivered more in anger than in relief".

During McNamara's first press conference, three weeks into his new role as Secretary of Defense, he was asked about the missile gap. According to Budiansky, McNamara replied, "Oh, I've learned there isn't any, or if there is, it's in our favor." The room promptly emptied as the Pentagon press corps rushed to break the news. Paul Nitze, Assistant Secretary of Defense for International Security Affairs, told the Soviet Ambassador to the United States that the missile gap favored the US. The president was embarrassed by the whole issue; the 19 April 1962 issue of The Listener noted, "The passages on the 'missile gap' are a little dated, since Mr Kennedy has now told us that it scarcely ever existed."

Now the president, Johnson told a gathering in 1967:

I wouldn't want to be quoted on this. ... We've spent $35 or $40 billion on the space program. And if nothing else had come out of it except the knowledge that we gained from space photography, it would be worth ten times what the whole program has cost. Because tonight we know how many missiles the enemy has and, it turned out, our guesses were way off. We were doing things we didn't need to do. We were building things we didn't need to build. We were harboring fears we didn't need to harbor.

== Effects ==
Warnings and calls to address imbalances between the fighting capabilities of two forces were not new, as a "bomber gap" had exercised political concerns only a few years earlier. What was different about the missile gap was the fear that a distant country could strike without warning from far away with little damage to themselves. Concerns about missile gaps and similar fears, such as nuclear proliferation, continue.

Promotion of the missile gap had several unintended consequences. The R-7 requires as much as 20 hours to be readied for launch so they could be easily attacked by bombers before they could strike. That demanded them be based in secret locations to prevent a pre-emptive strike on them. As Corona could find the sites no matter where they were located, the Soviets decided not to build large numbers of R-7s and preferred more-advanced missiles that could be launched more quickly.

Later evidence has emerged that one consequence of Kennedy pushing the false idea that America was behind the Soviets in a missile gap was that Soviet premier Nikita Khrushchev and senior Soviet military figures began to believe that Kennedy was a dangerous extremist, who worked with the American military to plant the idea of a Soviet first-strike capability to justify a pre-emptive American attack. That belief about Kennedy as a militarist was reinforced in Soviet minds by the Bay of Pigs invasion of 1961, which led to the Cuban Missile Crisis after the Soviets placed nuclear missiles in Cuba in 1962.

== Second claim in 1970s ==
A second claim of a missile gap appeared in 1974. Albert Wohlstetter, a professor at the University of Chicago, accused the CIA of systematically underestimating Soviet missile deployment in his 1974 foreign policy article, "Is There a Strategic Arms Race?" Wohlstetter concluded that the US was allowing the USSR to achieve military superiority by not closing a perceived missile gap. Many conservatives then began a concerted attack on the CIA's annual assessment of the Soviet threat.

That led to an exercise in competitive analysis, with a group called Team B being created with the production of a highly controversial report.

According to Secretary of State Henry Kissinger, the USA had a six-to-one advantage in the number of nuclear warheads over the USSR by 1976.

A 1979 briefing note on the National Intelligence Estimate (NIE) of the missile gap concluded that the NIE's record on estimating the Soviet missile force in the 1970s was mixed. The NIE estimates for initial operational capability (IOC) date for MIRVed ICBMs and SLBMs were generally accurate, as were the NIE predictions on the development of Soviet strategic air defenses. However, the NIE predictions also overestimated the scope of infrastructure upgrades in the Soviet system and underestimated the speed of Soviet improvement in accuracy and proliferation of re-entry vehicles.

NIE results were regarded as improving but still vague, showing broad fluctuations and little long-term validity.

== In popular culture ==
The whole idea of a missile gap was parodied in the 1964 film Dr. Strangelove or: How I Learned to Stop Worrying and Love the Bomb, in which a doomsday device is built by the Soviets because they had read in The New York Times that the US was working along similar lines and wanted to avoid a "Doomsday Gap". As the weapon is set up to go off automatically if the USSR is attacked, which occurs as the film progresses, the president is informed that all life on the surface will be killed off for a period of years. The only hope for survival is to select important people and place them deep underground in mine shafts until the radiation clears. The generals almost immediately begin to worry about a "mine shaft gap" between the US and Soviets. In reference to the alleged "missile gap" itself, General Turgidson mentions off-hand at one point that the United States actually has a five-to-one rate of missile superiority against the USSR. The Soviet ambassador himself also explains that one of the major reasons that the Soviets began work on the doomsday machine was that they realized that they simply could never match the rate of American military production (let alone outproduce American missile construction). The doomsday machine cost only a small fraction of what the Soviets normally spent on defense in a single year.

== See also ==
- Cruiser gap
- Nuclear arms race
