= Sequest =

- Original authors: Jimmy Eng, Ashley McCormack and John Yates
- Operating system: Windows, Linux
- Type: Protein identification
- License: proprietary (algorithm subject to U.S. patents 6,017,693 and 5,538,897, and a European patent)
- Website: Thermo, Yates' Lab, UWPR

Sequest (often stylized as SEQUEST) is a tandem mass spectrometry data analysis program used for protein identification. Sequest identifies collections of tandem mass spectra to peptide sequences that have been generated from databases of protein sequences.

== Algorithm ==
Sequest identifies each tandem mass spectrum individually. The software evaluates protein sequences from a database to compute the list of peptides that could result from each. The peptide's intact mass is known from the mass spectrum, and Sequest uses this information to determine the set of candidate peptides sequences that could meaningfully be compared to the spectrum by including only those near the mass of the observed peptide ion. For each candidate peptide, Sequest projects a theoretical tandem mass spectrum, and Sequest compares these theoretical spectra to the observed tandem mass spectrum by the use of cross correlation. The candidate sequence with the best matching theoretical tandem mass spectrum is reported as the best identification for this spectrum.

== See also ==
- Bottom-up proteomics
- Mascot (software)
- Shotgun proteomics
