= MOWSE =

MOWSE (for Molecular Weight Search) is a method to identify proteins from the molecular weight of peptides created by proteolytic digestion and measured with mass spectrometry.

== Development ==
The MOWSE algorithm was developed by Darryl Pappin at the Imperial Cancer Research Fund and Alan Bleasby at the SERC Daresbury Laboratory. The probability-based MOWSE score formed the basis of development of Mascot, a proprietary software for protein identification from mass spectrometry data.

== See also ==
- Peptide mass fingerprinting
- Mascot (software)
- Genome-based peptide fingerprint scanning
