= Enoyl coenzyme A hydrase (D) =

Enoyl coenzyme A hydrase (D) may refer to the following enzymes:

- 3-hydroxybutyryl-CoA dehydratase
- Enoyl-CoA hydratase
