= GFS Projects =

British aerospace company

GFS Projects Limited is a British company developing a vertical take-off and landing aircraft shaped like a flying saucer. The company was established in 2002 by Geoff Hatton, and won a contract with the US government in 2007 to design an unmanned aerial vehicle.

The GFS Projects design uses the Coandă effect, unlike the failed 1950s Avrocar project. The GFS Projects design is mechanically simpler, using negative upper surface air pressure caused by the Coanda effect. Scale prototypes capable of controlled flight have existed since 2005, constructed by both GFS Projects Ltd and amateur (enthusiast) UAV builders.

GFS is an abbreviation of Geoff's Flying Saucer.

== Technical background ==
The concept of creating a disk or polygonal aircraft has been around for many years and there are numerous patent applications but the first relying on the Coanda effect acting on the upper surface alone was first put forward in a paper by R. J. Collins.

Collins' invention is intended for civil UAV applications and aerial monitoring of urban areas.

A further paper described for a fully steerable and controllable air space platform accompanied by video footage of lift and attitude control. The Coanda disk concept has a number of attractive features for use in a non hostile environments, however one disadvantage is that flight control presents a heavy power over head compared to other vertical take off and landing air platforms. As a consequence, flight endurance using electric or even internal combustion engines does not compare favorably with helicopters.. To overcome this problem, a disk gas turbine engine has been specifically designed to be accommodated on a Coanda disk aircraft.
