= Chrysler VZ-6 =

1959 experimental aircraft

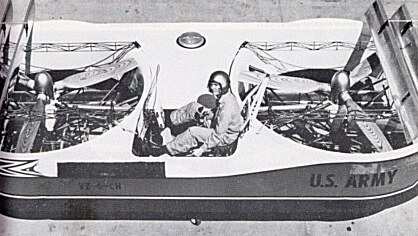

General information
- Type: VTOL experimental platform
- National origin: United States
- Manufacturer: Chrysler
- Number built: 2

History
- First flight: 1959

The Chrysler VZ-6 was an American VTOL ducted-fan test vehicle designed and built by Chrysler for the United States Army Flying Jeep competition.

== Design and development ==
Ordered in 1958, two VZ-6s were built. It was a rectangular-shaped vehicle with two three-bladed propellers inset at the front and back. The 500 hp Lycoming engine was located in the center driving the ducted fan propellers. It was also fitted with rubber skirts around the bottom edge of the vehicle similar to a hovercraft.

== Operational history ==
The VZ-6 started tethered flight tests in 1959, but these showed that the vehicle was overweight and underpowered with stability problems. An attempt at a non-tethered flight resulted in the VZ-6 flipping over, writing off the vehicle, but the pilot escaped without any serious injuries. Both VZ-6s were scrapped in 1960.

== Specifications ==
Data from

General characteristics

- Crew: 1
- Length: 21 ft 6 in (6.55 m)
- Height: 5 ft 2 in (1.57 m)
- Gross weight: 2,400 lb (1,089 kg)
- Powerplant: 1 × Lycoming , 500 hp (370 kW)
- Main rotor diameter: 2 × 8 ft 6 in (2.59 m)

== See also ==
Aircraft of comparable role, configuration, and era

- Avro Canada VZ-9 Avrocar – 1959 experimental VTOL aircraft model
- Curtiss-Wright VZ-7 – VTOL quadrotor helicopter aircraft
- Piasecki VZ-8 Airgeep – VTOL aircraft prototype by Piasecki Aircraft

Related lists

- List of military aircraft of the United States
- List of single seat helicopters
