= Policy by press release =

Campaign to influence administrative action through public relations and outcry

Policy by press release refers to the act of attempting to influence public policy by press releases intended to alarm the public into demanding action from their elected officials. In modern times, the term is used to dismiss an opponent's claims by suggesting the arguments to be lacking in substance and created solely to generate media attention.

== Cold War ==
Perhaps the most common use of the term refers to an infamous period during the Eisenhower administration when "leaked" documents were a common way for the various branches of the US military to attempt to garner funding for their pet projects when traditional chains of command failed, or they actively ended them. Practically any idea, no matter how outlandish, could gain some traction by simply claiming that the Soviet Union was working on a similar device.

The first and most costly example of this behavior was the mythical "bomber gap." After seeing the latest Soviet jet-powered bomber designs in 1955, a clamor broke out in Washington about the Soviets developing a lead in deploying strategic bombers, with estimates that hundreds would be available shortly. The result was a massive expansion of the US building program, which led to the eventual introduction of about 2,500 jet bombers. Although it was not revealed at the time, US intelligence services had actually made real estimates of the size of the Soviet fleet as early as 1956, placing it at around 20 aircraft.

Nevertheless, the tactic of claiming the gap existed and then brushing aside any criticism as being "weak on defense," was so successful it led to a wave of similar claims.

Another famous case was a claim that suggested the Soviets were working on a global-range nuclear aircraft. An article, complete with images claimed to be leaked by a spy agency, appeared in the December 1958 issue of Aviation Week. The article described a system that was suspiciously similar to some of the designs that were currently under consideration by large US aviation companies. Concerns were soon expressed that "the Russians were from three to five years ahead of the US in the field of atomic aircraft engines and that they would move even further ahead unless the US pressed forward with its own program."

In fact, the entire article was a hoax; third parties later revealed that the aircraft appearing in the pictures was the entirely conventional Myasishchev M-50 Bounder, which never entered production. Nevertheless, the controversy managed to secure, for a time, continued funding of US efforts, which culminated in the NB-36 testbed aircraft. The Soviets did have a nuclear aircraft design of their own, the Tupolev Tu-95LAL, but it did not fly until years later.

Another apparent case of policy by press release was the famous Look article on flying saucers. At the time, the US Air Force and then the US Army were funding the development of the Avrocar at Avro Canada in Toronto. The article, in the 14 June 1955 edition, suggested that the recent wave of saucer reports were possibly caused by Soviet flying saucers, and the article went on to describe them and their capabilities. It included several images that appeared to be provided to them by Avro Canada, or someone in contact with them, including a description of the control system, which was identical to the one used on the Avrocar. In the end, the concept proved unfeasible, and the Avrocar project was eventually canceled in 1961. The article nevertheless remains famous, as it is often presented as a US government misinformation campaign to deflect attention away from "real" UFOs: to exactly what end varies by the source.

== Contemporary use ==
The term is now more commonly used, especially in the US, to refer to environmental policy, but it is still used in discussions of defense policy. Myriad claims asserting global warming or ozone depletion have been described by editorialists, such as Mark Martin, the Chronicle Sacramento Bureau, and Hugh Ellsaesser, as "policy by press release."

Likewise, the implication that Iraq was involved in the September 11 attacks or possessed weapons of mass destruction, based on evidence that the CIA's own reports had dismissed, was described as "policy by press release" by John Kerry and Lou Dobbs.

A related term, public health by press release, is occasionally used ironically to imply official pronouncements or media campaigns belie inadequate effort or funding, but the term appeared in an article warning against a pitfall from the opposite direction (potential misassessment of limited clinical studies by press and policymakers).
