= Curtiss-Wright VZ-7 =

VTOL quadrotor helicopter aircraft

VZ-7
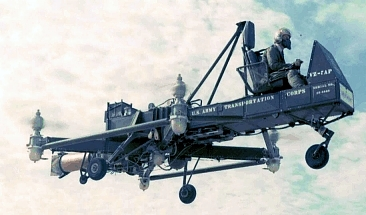

General information
- Type: VTOL utility aircraft
- National origin: United States
- Manufacturer: Curtiss-Wright
- Status: Canceled
- Primary user: United States Air Force
- Number built: 2

History
- First flight: 1958 ?
- Retired: 1960

The Curtiss-Wright VZ-7 (also known as the VZ-7AP) was a VTOL quadrotor helicopter aircraft designed by the Curtiss-Wright company for the US Army. Like the Chrysler VZ-6 and the VZ-8 Airgeep it was to be a "flying jeep".

== Design and development ==
The Aerophysics Development Corporation, a subsidiary of Curtiss-Wright, designed an "Aerial Platform" for a US Army Transport and Research Command "Flying Jeep" design competition. The Aerophysics design sat two in tandem between four ducted fan rotors and could also be armed with machine-guns or recoil-less rifles.

To prove the design concept the US Army ordered two prototypes of a smaller single-seat demonstrator, the VZ-7, which were delivered to the US Army in mid-1958. The VZ-7 had a fuselage with the pilot's seat, fuel tanks and flight controls. On both sides of the fuselage the four propeller/rotors were attached, unshrouded (the aircraft did originally have shrouds, but these were later removed). The VZ-7 was controlled by changing the thrust of each propeller and was maneuverable and easy to fly.

== Operational history ==
The aircraft performed well during tests but, not being able to meet the Army's standards, was retired and returned to the manufacturer in 1960.

One VZ-7 is part of the United States Army Aviation Museum aircraft collection at Fort Novosel. However, it is not currently on public display due to space restrictions.

== Specifications ==
Data from Flying Jeeps

General characteristics

- Crew: 1
- Length: 17 ft 0 in (5.18 m)
- Width: 16 ft 0 in (4.88 m)
- Height: 9 ft 4 in (2.84 m)
- Empty weight: 1,700 lb (771 kg)
- Gross weight: 2,100 lb (953 kg)
- Powerplant: 1 × Turbomeca Artouste IIB turboshaft engine, 425 shp (317 kW)

Performance

- Maximum speed: 32 mph (51 km/h, 28 kn)
- Cruise speed: 25 mph (40 km/h, 22 kn)
- Service ceiling: 200 ft (61 m)

== See also ==
- Lunar Landing Research Vehicle

Aircraft of comparable role, configuration, and era

- Avro Canada VZ-9 Avrocar
- VZ-8 Airgeep
- Chrysler VZ-6

Related lists

- List of single seat helicopters
