= 3-hydroxybutyryl-CoA dehydratase =

Class of enzymes

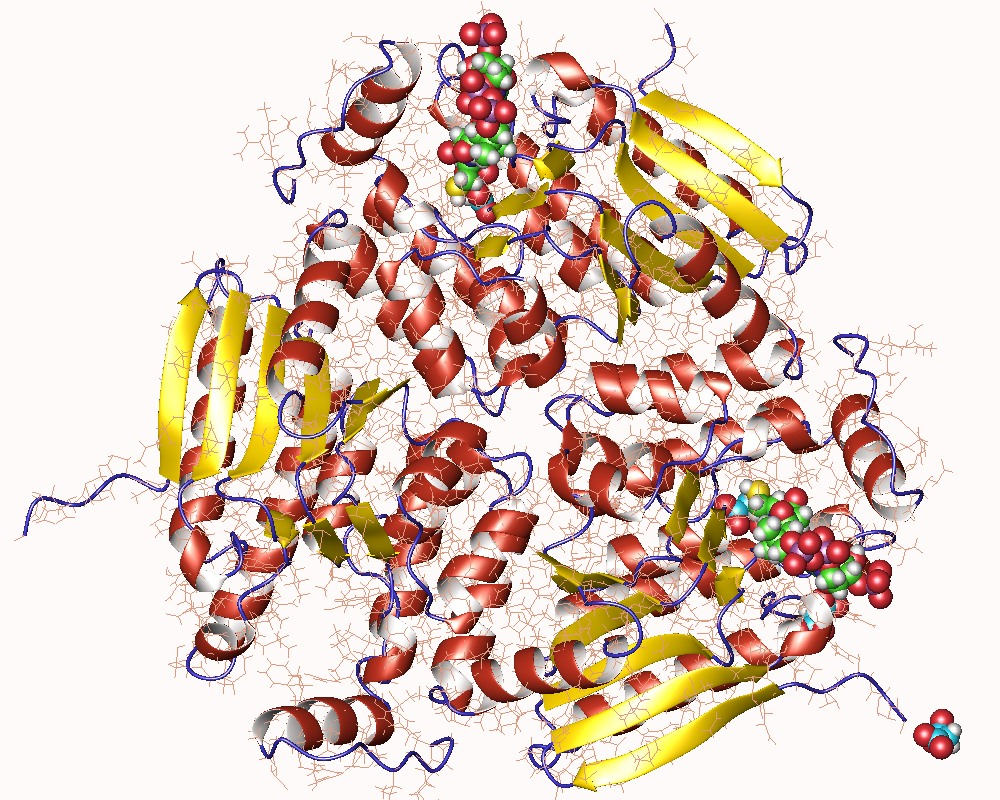
- 3-hydroxybutyryl-CoA dehydratase homotrimer, Myxococcus xanthus

Identifiers
- EC no.: 4.2.1.55
- CAS no.: 37290-82-7

Databases
- IntEnz: IntEnz view
- BRENDA: BRENDA entry
- ExPASy: NiceZyme view
- KEGG: KEGG entry
- MetaCyc: metabolic pathway
- PRIAM: profile
- PDB structures: RCSB PDB PDBe PDBsum
- Gene Ontology: AmiGO / QuickGO
Search
- PMC: articles
- PubMed: articles
- NCBI: proteins

The enzyme 3-hydroxybutyryl-CoA dehydratase (EC 4.2.1.55) catalyzes the chemical reaction

(3R)-3-hydroxybutanoyl-CoA $\rightleftharpoons$ crotonoyl-CoA + H_{2}O

This enzyme belongs to the family of lyases, specifically the hydro-lyases, which cleave carbon-oxygen bonds. The systematic name of this enzyme class is (3R)-3-hydroxybutanoyl-CoA hydro-lyase (crotonoyl-CoA-forming). Other names in common use include D-3-hydroxybutyryl coenzyme A dehydratase, D-3-hydroxybutyryl-CoA dehydratase, enoyl coenzyme A hydrase (D), and (3R)-3-hydroxybutanoyl-CoA hydro-lyase. This enzyme participates in butanoate metabolism.
