= John R. Yates =

American chemist

- Education: University of Maine; University of Virginia
- Known for: Mass Spectrometry
- Scientific career
- Fields: Chemist
- Workplaces: The Scripps Research Institute

John R. Yates III is an American chemist and Ernest W. Hahn Professor in the Departments of Molecular Medicine and Neurobiology at The Scripps Research Institute in La Jolla, California. He is currently editor-in-chief of the Journal of Proteome Research. He appeared on list of 2022, 2023 and 2024 Highly Cited Researchers, making him among the top one percent of most cited researchers in the world.

His work is focused on developing tools and in proteomics and he specializes in mass spectrometry. He is best known for the development of the Sequest algorithm for automated peptide sequencing and Multidimensional Protein Identification Technology (MudPIT) and data-independent acquisition. His lab is known for its contribution to methods to identify structural changes in proteins in living cells as well as method to identify N-glycan processing and occupancy using mass spectrometry such as covalent protein painting, and DeGlyPHER (Deglycosylation-dependent Glycan/Proteomic Heterogeneity Evaluation Report). His laboratory has made important contributions to understanding the biochemical mechanisms behind the failure of △F508 cystic fibrosis ion transport regulator to mature.

== Honors and awards ==
- 2004 - Biemann Medal
- 2015 - Ralph N. Adams Award in Bioanalytical Chemistry
- 2015 - ACS Award in Analytical Chemistry
- 2019 - John B. Fenn Award
- 2026 - Canada Gairdner International Award.
