= Piasecki VZ-8 Airgeep =

VTOL aircraft prototype by Piasecki Aircraft

VZ-8 Airgeep
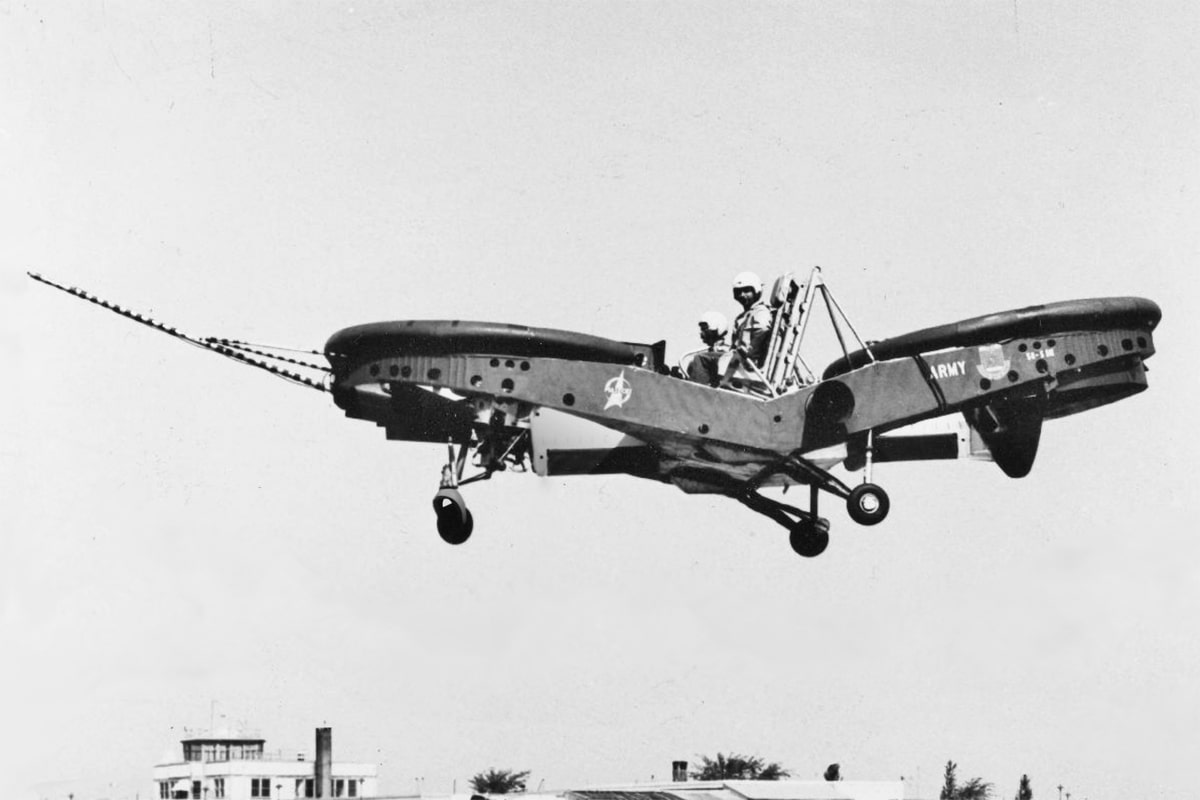
- The VZ-8P Airgeep II first flight in 1962

General information
- Type: Experimental rotorcraft
- Manufacturer: Piasecki Aircraft
- Status: Evaluation program ended, no contract for production
- Primary user: United States Army
- Number built: 2 prototypes

History
- First flight: early 1959

The Piasecki VZ-8 Airgeep (company designation PA-59) was a prototype vertical takeoff and landing (VTOL) aircraft developed by Piasecki Aircraft. The Airgeep was developed to fulfill a U.S. Army Transportation Research Command contract for a flying jeep in 1957. The flying jeep was envisioned to be smaller and easier to fly than a helicopter.

== Design and development ==
To meet the US Army's requirement, Piasecki's design featured two tandem, three-blade ducted rotors, with the crew of two seated between the two rotors. Power was by two 180 hp (134.2 kW) Lycoming O-360-A2A piston engines, driving the rotors by a central gearbox. The first of two aircraft ordered by the Army, initially designated the Model 59K Skycar (and later renamed Airgeep) by Piasecki and designated VZ-8P by the Army, flew on 22 September 1958.

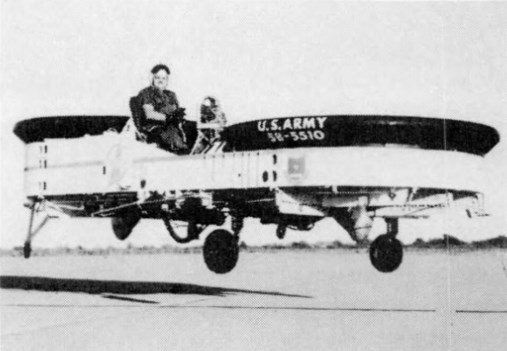
VZ-8P in 1959

It was re-engined with a single 425 hp (317 kW) Turbomeca Artouste IIB turboshaft replacing the two piston engines, flying in this form in June 1959. After being loaned to the U.S. Navy for evaluation as the Model 59N where it was fitted with floats, it was returned to the Army and its engine replaced by a lighter and more powerful 550 hp (410.1 kW) Garrett AiResearch TPE331-6 engine.

The second prototype was completed to a modified design, designated Model 59H AirGeep II by Piasecki and VZ-8P (B) by the Army. It was powered by two Artouste engines, with ejection seats for the pilot and co-pilot/gunner and a further three seats for passengers. It was also fitted with a powered tricycle undercarriage to increase mobility on land.

The AirGeep II's first flight occurred on 15 February 1962, piloted by "Tommy" Atkins.

While the Airgeep would normally operate close to the ground, it was capable of flying to several thousand feet, proving to be stable in flight. Flying low allowed it to evade detection by radar. Despite these qualities, and its superiority over the other two types evaluated by the US Army to meet the same requirement (the Chrysler VZ-6 and the Curtiss-Wright VZ-7), the Army decided that the "Flying Jeep concept [was] unsuitable for the modern battlefield", and concentrated on the development of conventional helicopters instead.

== Variants ==
Model 59K Skycar
Company designation for the first aircraft powered by two 180 hp (134.2 kW)) Lycoming O-360-A2A piston engines, given the military designation VZ-8P Airgeep. Later, the piston engines were replaced by a single 425 hp (316.9 kW)) Turbomeca Artouste IIB turboshaft engine.

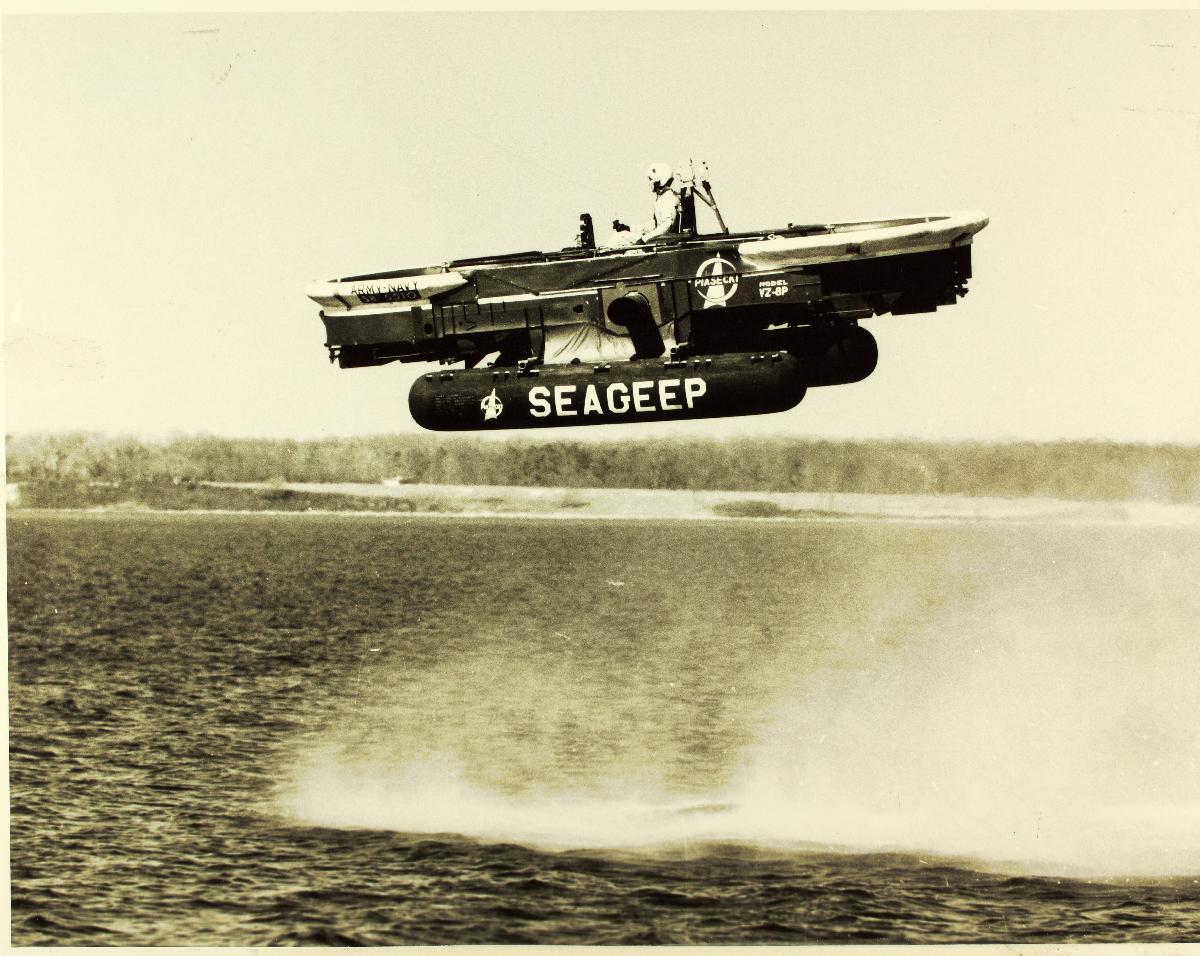
Piasecki Model PA-59N SEAGEEP

Model 59N SeaGeep I
The first aircraft, (after the piston engines were replaced by a single Artouste), whilst on loan to the United States Navy, fitted with floats.
PA-59H AirGeep II
The second aircraft, military designation VZ-8P (B), completed with two 400 hp (298.3 kW)) Turbomeca Artouste IIC turboshaft engines and seats for up to five, including the crew.
VZ-8P Airgeep I
The military designation of the first aircraft as delivered
VZ-8P-1 Airgeep I
The first aircraft after the piston engines were replaced by a single 425 hp (316.9 kW) Turbomeca Artouste IIB.
VZ-8P-2 Airgeep I
The first aircraft after the Artouste engine was replaced by a lighter and more powerful 550 hp (410.1 kW)) Garrett AiResearch TPE331-6 engine.
VZ-8P (B) Airgeep II
The military designation of the second aircraft.

== Specifications (VZ-8P (B)) ==
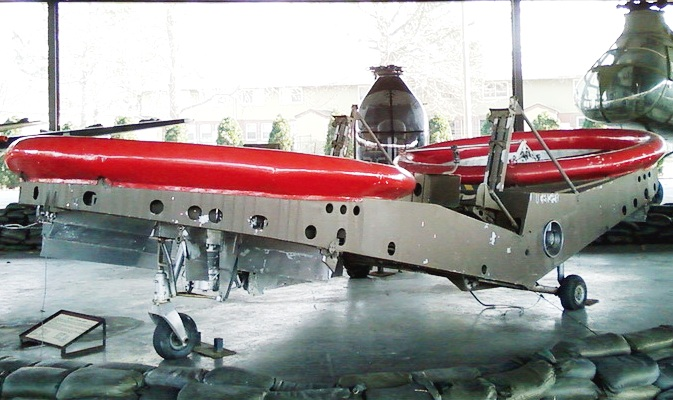
A VZ-8 Airgeep on display

Data from Jane's All the World's Aircraft 1962-63 Flying Jeeps: The US Army's Search for the Ultimate 'Vehicle'

General characteristics

- Crew: two (pilot and co-pilot/gunner)
- Capacity: up to three passengers
- Length: 24 ft 5 in (7.45 m)
- Width: 9 ft 3 in (2.82 m)
- Height: 5 ft 10 in (1.78 m)
- Empty weight: 2,611 lb (1,184 kg)
- Gross weight: 3,670 lb (1,665 kg)
- Max takeoff weight: 4,800 lb (2,177 kg)
- Powerplant: 2 × Turbomeca Artouste IIC turbo-shaft engines, 550 hp (410 kW) each
- Main rotor diameter: 2 × 8 ft 2 in (2.5 m)

Performance

- Maximum speed: 73 kn (85 mph, 136 km/h)
- Cruise speed: 60 kn (70 mph, 112 km/h)
- Range: 30 nmi (35 mi, 56 km)
- Service ceiling: 3,000 ft (914 m)

Armament

- Guns: Provision for one recoilless rifle - not fitted

== See also ==
Aircraft of comparable role, configuration, and era

- Avro Canada VZ-9 Avrocar – 1959 experimental VTOL aircraft model
- Curtiss-Wright VZ-7 – VTOL quadrotor helicopter aircraft
- Chrysler VZ-6 – 1959 experimental aircraft
