= GF =

GF, gf or gF may refer to:

== Arts and entertainment ==
- GuitarFreaks, a music video game series
- Ground Floor, an American comedy series created by Bill Lawrence and Greg Malins
- Gravity Falls, a Disney TV show
- Girls' Frontline, a strategy role-playing mobile game

== Businesses and organizations ==
=== Airlines ===
- Gulf Air (IATA airline designator: GF)
- Sierra Leone (ICAO airport designator prefix: GF)

=== Other businesses and organizations ===
- Game Freak, a game developer
- Georg Fischer, abbreviated +GF+
- GlobalFoundries, a semiconductor foundry headquartered in Santa Clara, California
- Grafiska Fackförbundet - Mediafacket, the Swedish Graphic Workers' Union

== Math, science, and technology ==
- Cyclosarin nerve gas (NATO designation: GF)
- Fermi's constant, G_{F}
- Fluid intelligence as opposed to gC, crystallized intelligence
- Galois field, in mathematics
- Generating function, in mathematics
- GF method, Wilson's normal mode analysis
- Gram force (symbol: gf)
- Grammatical Framework, a type-theoretic grammar formalism
- Greater fool theory, in economics
- Growth factor, in biology
- Glass Fibre, in Plastic material identification

== Other uses ==
- French Guiana (ISO 3166 country code: GF)
- Goals for, a statistic in ice hockey and other sports
- Girlfriend
- Gluten free, denoting foods free from the protein gluten
- Good faith, a sincere intention
- Good Friday, a Christian holiday
- Godfather, a male godparent
- Dominical letter GF, for a leap year starting on Monday
- Good fight, what is generally said after a fight in a Massively multiplayer online game
- A first generation Subaru Impreza station wagon (ID code: GF)
- Berliet GF, a range of heavy-duty trucks
