= Avro Canada VZ-9 Avrocar =

1959 experimental VTOL aircraft model

VZ-9 Avrocar
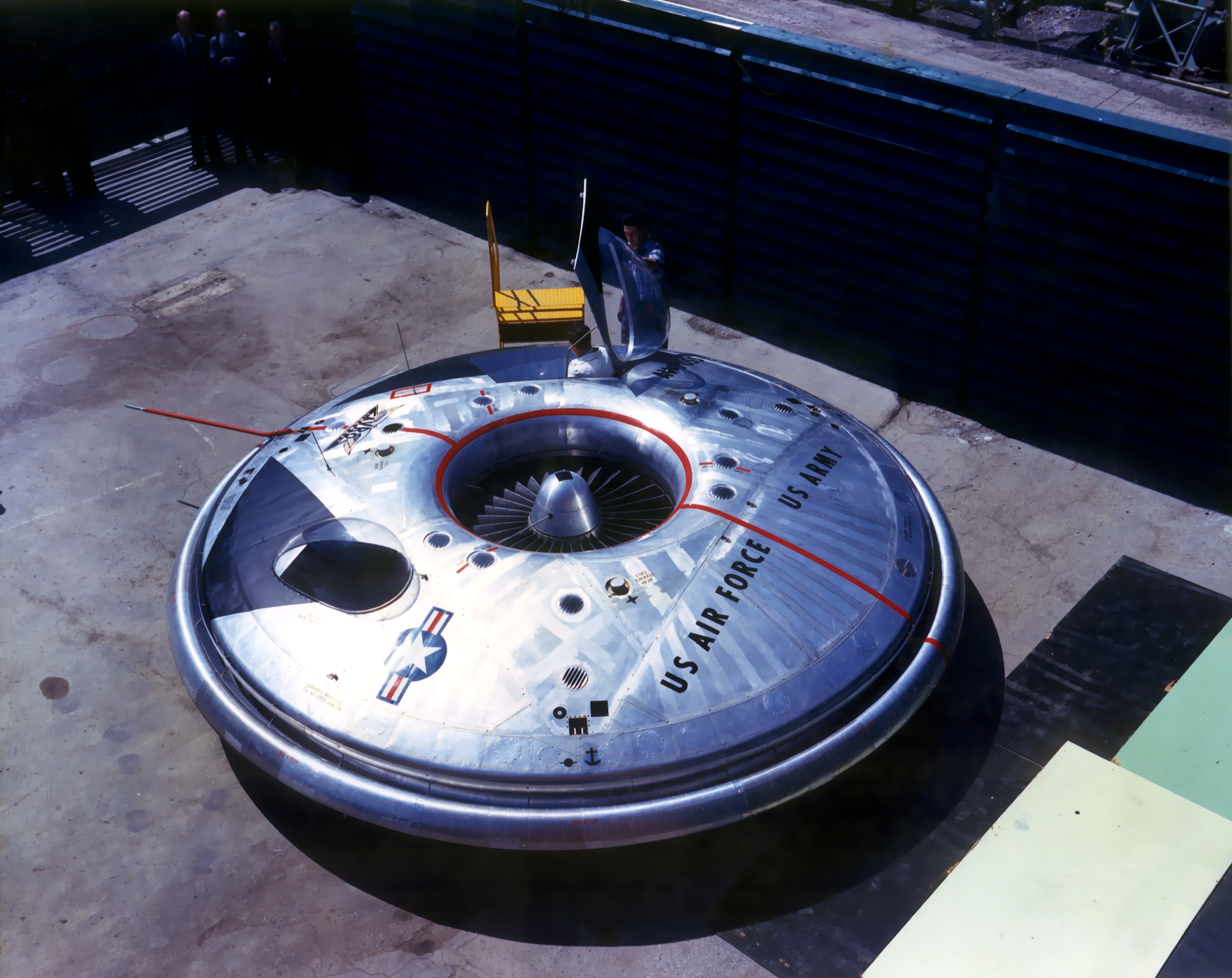
- The Avrocar S/N 58-7055 (marked AV-7055) on its rollout.

General information
- Type: "Proof of concept" VTOL experimental aircraft
- National origin: Canada
- Manufacturer: Avro Canada
- Designer: John Frost
- Primary users: United States Air Force (intended) United States Army (intended)
- Number built: 2

History
- Manufactured: 1958–1959
- Introduction date: 1958
- First flight: 12 November 1959
- Retired: 1961

The Avro Canada VZ-9 Avrocar is a VTOL aircraft developed by Avro Canada as part of a secret U.S. military project carried out in the early years of the Cold War. The Avrocar intended to exploit the Coandă effect to provide lift and thrust from a single "turborotor" blowing exhaust out of the rim of the disk-shaped aircraft. In the air, it would have resembled a flying saucer.

Originally designed as a fighter-like aircraft capable of very high speeds and altitudes, the project was repeatedly scaled back over time and the U.S. Air Force eventually abandoned it. Development was then taken up by the U.S. Army for a tactical combat aircraft requirement, a sort of high-performance helicopter. In flight testing, the Avrocar proved to have unresolved thrust and stability problems that limited it to a degraded, low-performance flight envelope; subsequently, the project was cancelled in September 1961.

Through the history of the program, the project was referred to by different names. Avro referred to the efforts as Project Y, with individual vehicles known as Spade and Omega. Project Y-2 was later funded by the U.S. Air Force, who referred to it as WS-606A, Project 1794 and Project Silver Bug. When the U.S. Army joined the efforts it took on its final name "Avrocar", and the designation "VZ-9", part of the U.S. Army's VTOL projects in the VZ series.

== Design and development ==
=== Origins ===
The Avrocar was the ultimate result of a series of blue skies research projects by designer "Jack" Frost, who had joined Avro Canada in June 1947 after working for several British firms. He had been with de Havilland from 1942 and had worked on the de Havilland Hornet, de Havilland Vampire jet fighter and the de Havilland Swallow aircraft, where he had been the chief designer on the supersonic research project.

At Avro Canada, he had worked on the Avro CF-100 before creating a research team known as the "Special Projects Group" (SPG). Frost first surrounded himself with a collection of like-minded "maverick" engineers, then arranged for a work site. Initially ensconced in the "Penthouse", a derisive nickname for the executive wing of the Administration Building, the SPG was subsequently relocated to a Second World War-era structure across from the company headquarters, the Schaeffer Building, that was secured with security guards, locked doors and special pass cards. At times, the SPG also operated out of the Experimental Hangar where it shared space with other esoteric Avro project teams.

At the time, Frost was particularly interested in jet engine design and ways to improve the efficiency of the compressor without sacrificing the simplicity of the turbine engine. He found Frank Whittle's "reverse flow" design too complex and was interested in ways to clean up the layout. This led him to design a new type of engine layout with the flame cans lying directly outside the outer rim of the centrifugal compressor, pointed outwards like the spokes on a wheel. Power for the compressor was drawn from a new type of turbine similar to a centrifugal fan, as opposed to the more typical pinwheel-like design of conventional engines. The turbine drove the compressor using gearing, rather than a shaft. The resulting engine was arranged in the form of a large disk, which he referred to as a "pancake engine".

=== Project Y ===
The Project Y mock-up in the Experimental Flight Hangar c. 1954. The scalloped nozzles on the near edge direct the jet thrust rearward. The cockpit is just visible at the front of the upper spine.

At the same time, the aircraft industry as a whole was becoming increasingly interested in VTOL aircraft. It was expected that any future European war would start with a nuclear exchange that would destroy most airbases, so aircraft would need to operate from limited airbases, roads or even unprepared fields. Considerable research effort was put into various solutions to securing a second-strike capability. Some of these solutions included rocket-launched aircraft like the zero-length launch concept, while many companies started work on VTOL aircraft as a more appropriate long-term solution.

Frost felt the excellent performance of his new engine would be a natural fit for a VTOL aircraft due to its high expected power-to-weight ratio. The problem was how to use the annular thrust to drive the aircraft forward, as well as the problem of fitting the very large engine into a suitable airframe. Frost suggested using a series of ducts and vents to redirect the thrust flowing out of the front of the engine towards the rear. In order to keep the pipes as short as possible, the design ported the thrust out along the leading edge of what was essentially a thick delta wing. As the engine was disk-shaped, the triangular delta shape was pushed out near the front where it met the engine disk, producing a shape roughly like a spade on a playing card.

The engine was disk shaped and its intake was positioned in the middle, which meant the engine air intakes had to be located near the middle of the wing. In the Ace design, these were located just to the front of the centre on the top and bottom of the aircraft. The cockpit was positioned over the main bearing, behind the intakes. A "spine" on the top and bottom ran from the cockpit area to the rear edge of the aircraft. Several other versions of the basic layout were also studied, including the "Omega" which was more disk-like as it cut away the rear portions of the delta wing as well.

For VTOL operations the aircraft was expected to sit pointed up, supported by long landing legs that extended out of the spine. Landing would be accomplished at a very high angle, making visibility during the approach very difficult. A number of other VTOL experiments of the era attempted various solutions to this problem, including rotating pilots seats and cockpits, but none proved very effective. Another problem with various VTOL experiments was that stability in a hover was difficult to arrange, although not entirely unexpected. A solution to this problem would require the thrust to be directed downward from a larger area, as it is in a helicopter, where the lift is supplied over the entire area of the rotor disk. Most designers turned to bleeding off air from the engine's compressor, and directing that through pipes arranged around the aircraft. Frost's engine design used such a large number of nozzles that such an arrangement would not be too easy to build.

In 1952, the design was advanced enough that the Canadian Defence Research Board funded the effort with a CAN$400,000 contract. By 1953, a wooden mock-up of Project Y was completed, of which only images remain. It appears the project was considered too costly within the military establishment, which was at the time involved in several extremely expensive air defense projects. On 11 February 1953, a story on the project was leaked to the Toronto Star along with images of the Omega design, apparently in order to gain further funding. (Note: This was a common strategy in the U.S. at the time, known as policy by press release.) Five days later, the Minister for Defence Production informed the House of Commons that Avro was indeed working on a "mock-up model" of a flying saucer, capable of flying at 1,500 miles per hour (2,400 km/h) and climbing vertically. Nevertheless, further funding was not forthcoming.

=== Project Y-2: the "flat-riser" ===
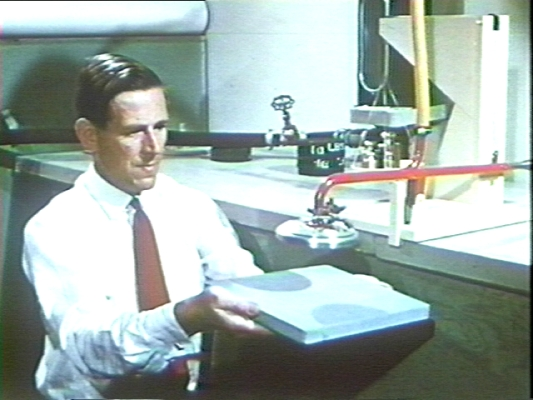
"Jack" Frost demonstrates the Coandă effect. Pressurized air flows out of the end of the red tube, and then over the top of the metal disk. The Coandă effect makes the air "stick" to the disk, bending down at the edges to flow vertically. This airflow supports the disk in the air.

While Project Y continued, Frost had meanwhile become interested in the Coandă effect, where fluid flows will follow strongly convex shapes, something that might be unexpected at first glance. Frost felt the effect could be used with his engine design to produce a more practical VTOL aircraft, the exhaust flowing outward over the upper surface of the aircraft and then being directed downward over a flap-like arrangement. This would produce a lift force around the entire edge of the aircraft, allowing it to land "flat". He produced a number of small experimental designs using compressed air in place of an engine in order to select a suitable airframe shape, and eventually decided that a disk was the best solution.

As he continued these experiments, he found that the same thrust-direction system he intended for VTOL operations worked just as well for forward flight. In this case the disk shape was not of itself a good lifting surface, as it was neutral in terms of lift direction – that is, it would fly sideways as readily as it would fly forward. However, by modifying the airflow with the application of a small amount of jet thrust, the overall airflow over the craft could be dramatically altered, creating a sort of "virtual airfoil" of any needed configuration. For instance, by directing even a small amount of jet thrust down, a large mass of air would be pulled over the upper surface of the wing and dramatically augment the flow over the wing, creating lift.

This appeared to offer a solution to one of the most vexing problems of the era, designing an aircraft that was effective at subsonic and supersonic speeds. Subsonic lift is created by the airflow around the wing following streamlines, but supersonic lift is generated by shock waves at points of critical curvature. No single design could offer high performance for both regimes. The blown disk could attack this problem by being laid out for supersonic performance only, and then using jet thrust to modify subsonic airflow into a semblance of a normal wing. The resulting design would be tuned for high supersonic performance, have reasonable subsonic performance, and would also offer VTOL, all in a single design.

=== U.S. Involvement: Project 1794/WS 606A ===
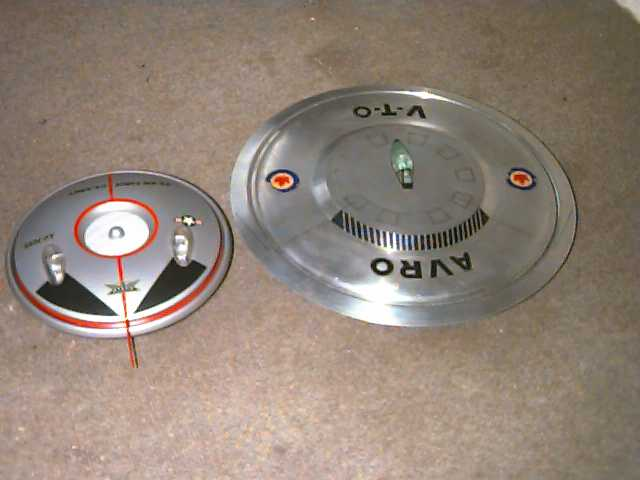
Avro company models of the Y-2 (right) and the Avrocar (left)

In late 1953, a group of U.S. defence experts visited Avro Canada to view the new CF-100 fighter jet. Somewhere along the way, Frost co-opted the tour and rerouted it to the Special Projects area where he proceeded to show off the Project Y mock-up and models and drawings (some never before seen by senior company officials) for a completely circular disk-shaped aircraft known as "Project Y-2". The USAF agreed to take over funding for Frost's Special Projects Group, and a contract for US$750,000 followed in 1955. By 1956, Avro management was interested enough to commit $2.5 million to build a "private venture" prototype. In March 1957, the Air Force added additional funding, and the aircraft became Weapons System 606A.

A wide variety of designs were studied for a VTOL fighter aircraft, all revolved around the disk shape, leading to the Project 1794 involving a supersonic large disk fighter aircraft. The concept proceeded to wind tunnel testing with a variety of scale models. It featured a raised section in the middle over the engine that contained the cockpit and a series of rectangular intakes that provided air to the engine during low-speed flight. For supersonic flight, the upper intakes were closed using louvers and air was instead provided from a separate supersonic intake along the front of the raised section. Frost's performance estimates for the concept were for a potential of Mach 3.5 at 100,000 ft (30,000 m) altitudes.

As Project 1794 was developed, Avro Canada proposed a version of the "Project Y", the TS-140, to meet the United States Navy's Specification TS-140 for a VTOL fighter aircraft in 1956; it was rejected by the Navy. The TS-140 was a canard type aircraft to be powered by four Bristol Orpheus jet engines; the Navy instead selected Bell Aircraft's D-188A for its requirement.

There was some debate about the concept within the USAF, as many groups were attempting to gain funding for their own pet projects, like nuclear powered bombers. In a repeat of the earlier Toronto Star release, in 1955 an extensive article appeared in Look magazine that, among other claims, speculated that current UFO sightings were Soviet-built saucers. (Note: Another common theme of policy by press release are claims that "the Soviets are doing it".) The article went on to describe such an aircraft with diagrams that were clearly influenced by the Avro design.

For testing purposes, a new engine consisting of six Armstrong Siddeley Viper jet engines blowing across the outer rim of an impeller was designed under the name PV-704, PV stood for Private Venture. The PV-704 was a stop-gap design built into a bunker-like building behind the Avro Experimental Test facility. It was intended to test various Project 1794 concepts and provide the USAF with test data to show the viability of the concept. The original plan to initially test the Viper Engine Rig was to have continued into free flight testing. Unfortunately, testing was anything but smooth; the test model suffered from hazardous oil leaks, resulting in three fires. It eventually got to the point that staff were afraid of the machine, even when safely ensconced in a booth constructed of bullet-proof glass and quarter-inch-thick steel. A final, disastrous and nearly lethal engine test in 1956 which involved a Viper jet engine running wild, convinced Frost that a less dangerous test vehicle was necessary.

=== Genesis of the Avrocar ===
To gather flight data on the basic concept while the engine development continued, in 1958 Frost proposed building a smaller "proof-of-concept" test vehicle he called the Avrocar. By this point, the U.S. Army was involved in a wide variety of experiments on smaller VTOL aircraft that would act as a "flying Jeep", and they became interested in Avro's concept as well. Frost pitched his smaller design both as a prototype of a vehicle suitable for the Army's needs, as well as an aerodynamic testbed for the WS-606. Initial performance requirements for the Avrocar were a ten-minute hover capability in ground effect and 25-mile (40 km) range with a 1,000 lb (450 kg) payload.

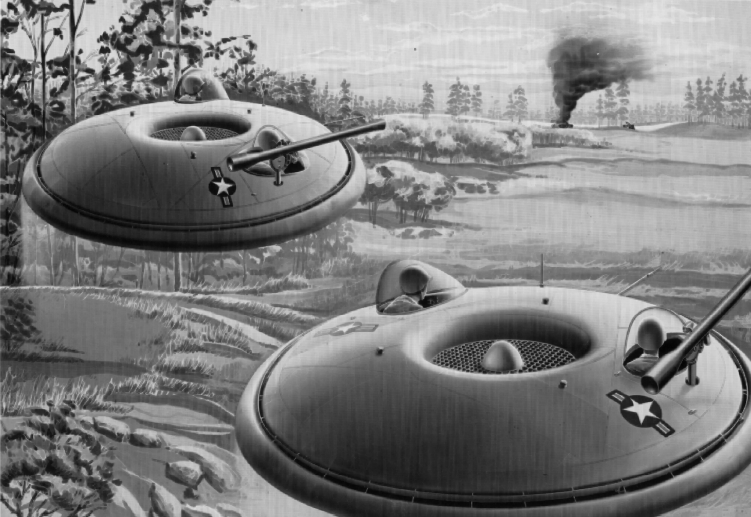
U.S. Army Avrocars depicted as "flying jeeps" in company literature

The new plan appeared to make everybody happy, and a $2 million joint-services contract managed by the Air Force was awarded to Avro to build and test two Avrocars, which the Army referred to as the VZ-9-AV (with AV standing for "Avro", an unusual departure from normal U.S. Army nomenclature), the latest in a series of "VZ" aircraft. Army interest in the Avrocar program was apparently very high. Bernard Lindenbaum of the Air Force Flight Dynamics Laboratory recalls a trip to Washington in the late 1950s to request additional funding for a study on helicopter drag reduction. Although the funding was approved, he overheard an Army General remark that the Huey would be the last helicopter the Army would buy since the helicopter would be replaced by the Avrocar.

Additional Air Force funding of approximately $700,000 (unexpended from the 606A program) was also moved to the Avrocar project. In March 1959, an additional $1.77 million contract was received for a second prototype. At rollout, projected performance was far in excess of the requirement, with a 225 knots (417 km/h) maximum speed, 10,000 feet (3,000 m) ceiling, 130-mile (209 km) range with 1,000 lb (450 kg) payload, and hover out of ground effect with 2,428 lb (1,101 kg) payload. Maximum takeoff weight with transition to forward flight out of ground effect was calculated to be 5,650 lb (2,560 kg), maximum weight with a transition in ground effect (GETOL) was 6,970 lb (3,160 kg).

Just as the first working test models were being manufactured, disaster struck. The Canadian government cancelled the Avro CF-105 Arrow program on "Black Friday", 20 February 1959. The ensuing result was the lay-off of almost all Avro Canada employees, including those with the Special Projects Group. However, three days following the announcement of the Arrow cancellation, many of the Special Projects employees were rehired. But it wasn't quite business as usual. The team now included people from the CF-100 and CF-105 teams and the Special Projects Group was moved into the main building, which was nearly empty. As well, company "brass" became more involved in the group's operations.

The USAF Project Office devoted to the Avro projects, recommended that the WS-606A and all related work (including the Avrocar) be cancelled. A "stop/go" work order came down and Frost was forced once more to try to rescue the project. In an elaborate effort, Frost made a resounding case for continuation of U.S. military funding. Late in May 1959, the USAF authorized Avro to continue the "flying saucer" programs.

== Design ==
The Avrocar was a disk-shaped aircraft with the same basic shape as a frisbee, the upper surface of the disk being fairly curved, and the bottom much less so. The disk was 18 feet (5.5 m) in diameter and 3.5 feet (1.1 m) thick. The main structural truss was a large equilateral triangle, to which the various components were attached. The 124-blade "turborotor" sat in the center of the triangle, with most of the rotor's thrust directed straight down through an opening in the lower surface, but some was bled off to power the control system running along the outer rim of the disk.

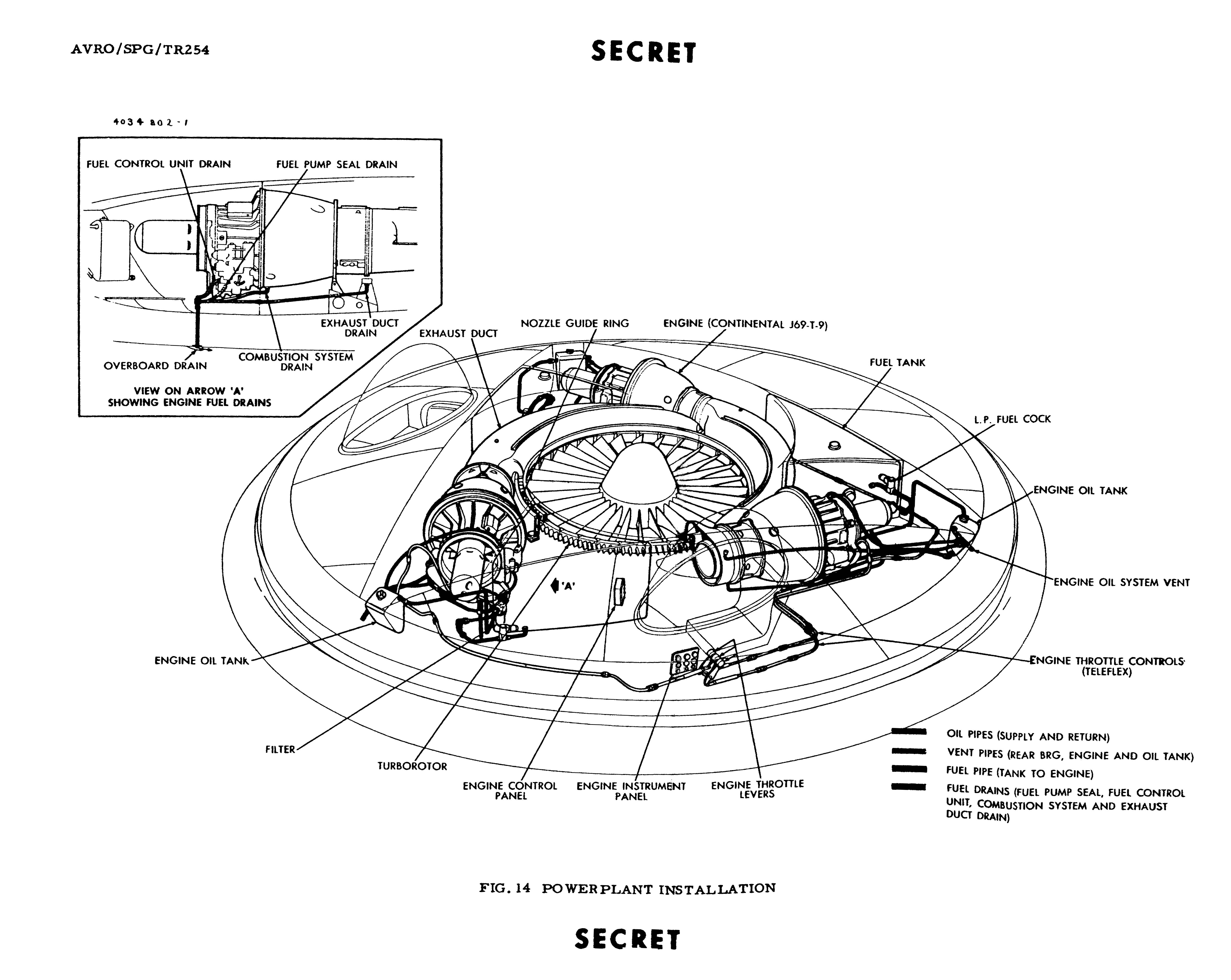
Avrocar schematic from the VZ-9 manual

Power for the rotor was provided by three Continental J69-T-9 jet engines attached to the truss. Each engine had its own fuel and oil tanks and other support systems, although it was expected these would be interconnected in future models. The majority of the airframe was made of aluminum with an empty weight of 3,000 pounds (1,400 kg). The undercarriage of the Avrocar was rudimentary with three small castering wheels mounted on "stub" shafts; a set of skids was substituted later in testing although they were not normally fitted.

Pilot control was entirely through a single side-mounted control stick. Pitch and roll were controlled through conventional fore-aft and side-to-side motions, while yaw could be controlled by twisting the stick. No mechanical linkages were used, the stick instead controlled the flow of high pressure air around the craft, which either directly attached to various control surfaces, or indirectly through local cable linkages to replace controls that were intended to be cable-actuated (like throttle controls on the engines).

The attitude/thrust control system consisted of a large ring situated outside of the main disk, shaped roughly like a rounded triangle with the flat surface on the "inside". Viewing the craft from the side, the control flap is almost invisible, appearing in its neutral position to blend into the profile. The pilot's controls moved the ring in relation to the rest of the craft, affecting the airflow moving outward from the center of the craft. Vertical lift could be increased by moving the entire ring down, which would produce more airflow over its upper surface, which would then bend down over this surface toward the ground. Tilting the ring resulted in asymmetric thrust for directional control.

It was discovered that the craft was inherently unstable in forward flight, as the aerodynamic center of pressure was well forward of the center of gravity. The Avrocar thus included a mechanical stability augmentation system that was independent of the pilot's controls. The turborotor had a fairly large angular momentum and was intended to act as a powerful gyroscope, providing a "normal" direction of flight. Control cables attached to the base of the rotor would be pulled when the craft moved in relation to the rotor, actuating the control surfaces to counteract the motion.

The vehicle was operated by a crew of two, positioned in separate cockpits squeezed into empty areas in the airframe. In practice, only one pilot was usually on board during testing; a number of flights were made with an observer in the second cockpit. Until control problems were completely solved, the Avro test pilots acquired a "touch" for the extremely sensitive control inputs and Avro Aircraft Chief Development Test Pilot Potocki was eventually able to demonstrate a "hands-off" flight. Nonetheless, Avro test pilot Peter Cope, USAF project pilot Walter J. Hodgson and NASA's Ames Research Center Chief Test Pilot Fred J. Drinkwater III, who all flew the Avrocar, considered it still a tricky vehicle to fly. Drinkwater likened a flight in it to "balancing on a beach ball".

== Operational history ==
=== Testing ===
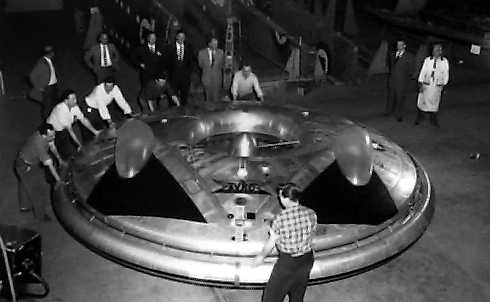
The first Avrocar being readied at the Avro factory c.1958

The first Avrocar, #58-7055, rolled out of the Avro Malton factory in May 1959. From 9 June to 7 October 1959, it was tested in a static hover rig. Unfortunately, hot gas from the exhaust was found to mix back into the intakes in hover, reducing engine thrust. In addition, the fan generated lift only from a small area of its surface, lowering overall thrust available. The ducts also proved to have higher losses than expected, and a series of modifications were not able to solve this problem to any large degree. These problems reduced maximum lift at higher altitudes out of the ground effect to 3,150 lb (1,430 kg), less than the empty weight of the aircraft at 4,285 lb (1,944 kg). This meant the aircraft would be incapable of hovering out of the ground effect. Following these tests, the vehicle was sent to NASA Ames for a wind tunnel testing.

The second, #59-4975, was completed August 1959. On 29 September, the first attempt to hover was made with the Avrocar tethered to the ground. After the vehicle became airborne, an uncontrollable roll and pitch-coupled oscillation started that forced each of the three wheels into the ground in turn. The pilot, W. D. "Spud" Potocki, immediately shut down all engines. Changes were made to the stability system to provide more control authority, while new tethers were investigated to improve the ability to control these sorts of problems. As testing continued it became clear that the problem was inherent to the design, and the engineers started referring to the effect as "hubcapping", so-named as it appeared similar to a hubcap spun on the ground.

Investigations into the effect revealed what was causing the problem. While in the ground effect, the high-pressure air under the craft was trapped, filling the entire area and thus providing a stable base. When the craft rose out of the ground effect, the air formed itself into a single narrow column, described by Frost as "tree trunking". At intermediate altitudes the craft would momentarily transition from one regime to the other, during which time one side of the vehicle would be entirely supported while the support was disappearing under the other. This led to a strong pitching motion towards the unsupported side. As soon as this occurred that side would approach the ground and re-establish the supporting air, while the other side would then be raised above this limit. This process would repeat itself, with the craft rolling from side to side. Modifications were carried out in order to try to solve the problem. Eventually a series of 52 holes were drilled in the bottom of the vehicle, located radially three feet from the center. These were to provide a central jet to stabilize the ground cushion.

With these modifications complete and apparently working, the first completely free flight occurred on 12 November 1959. This test proved the nozzle control system unacceptable. The spoilers were intended to direct the air out over the top or bottom of the annular flap, out the bottom only during hover, but over the top and bottom during forward flight. The idea was that when the flap was positioned in order to provide control, the lift would be lowered on one side and raised on the other. Lift was indeed lowered on one side, but the lift did not improve on the other, so every control input resulted in a loss of altitude. After five flights, testing was temporarily halted on 5 December 1959, by which time the Avrocar had logged 18.5 hours of test time in total.

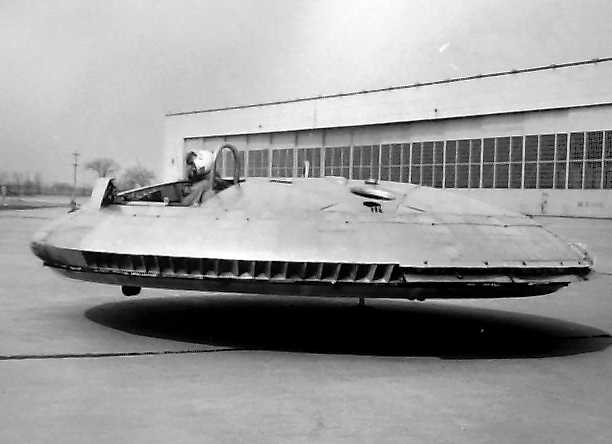
Avrocar 59-4975 after modifications, was tested without the canopies and incorporating the perimeter "focusing" ring c. 1961. Tests showed that the heat was so oppressive that all instruments were baked brown after only a few flights.

A completely new design was installed over the winter. The original spoilers were removed and replaced by a single ring below the annular flap. The ring shifted in relation to the craft under control input, "sealing off" the gap on one side while opening it on the other. Tests continued in January 1960, and appeared to work much better. However, while the new control system improved the hovering qualities, the craft now became unstable at higher speeds above 30 knots (56 km/h). The first Avrocar at Ames was similarly modified, and, in April 1960, it was tested in their 40 ft × 80 ft (12 m × 24 m) wind tunnel. The problem became clear; the ring blocked so much of the overall engine thrust that the overall power was greatly reduced. As the craft sped up, the airflow on the underside reduced the recirculation, reducing the lift due to airflow over the upper surface. This was somewhat unexpected; recirculation had been considered a "bad thing" due to the loss of engine thrust, and its positive effects on lift do not appear to have been appreciated. In the end, in order to maintain lift at higher forward speeds the craft had to be pitched to the end of its control capability.

Avro was convinced that the concept was still workable, and proposed a new program for major rework of the propulsion and control system. Instead of the single annular triangular flap and spoilers, or the later ring control, the new system included two separate control systems for hover and forward flight, combined into a single nozzle. For hover, a series of "transition doors" were opened into the nozzles, blocking them off and re-directing the flow downward under the aircraft. Control during this regime was provided by moving the outer portion of the flap to "focus" the flow. At higher speeds, the doors were closed, allowing the air to flow out from the edge of the aircraft, where a series of simple flap-like controls were located. The new control system covered the rear 3/4's of the aircraft's outer circumference; the front section featured the hovering controls only.

Modifications were completed on the Ames model and testing resumed in April 1961. The new design demonstrated much better control in hover and considerably improved lift. The vehicle was now able to travel at up to 100 knots (190 km/h), a great improvement over the 30 knots (56 km/h) previously reached. However, it remained unstable in pitch, and exhibited a strong nose-up trim. NASA engineers attempted to modify this with a T-tail, but this proved to sit within the airflow of the turborotor and did not help. Frost's team considered two new designs, one with a large vertical tail and one with a wing with tip mounted verticals — "winglets". Both designs used two 2,700 lbf (12 kN) thrust General Electric J85 turbojets and increased the turborotor diameter from five to six ft.

On 9 June 1961, a second USAF/NASA flight evaluation of the Avrocar was conducted on the similarly modified second prototype at the Avro facility. During these tests, the vehicle reached a maximum speed of 20 knots (37 km/h) and showed the ability to traverse a ditch six feet across and 18 inches (460 mm) deep. Flight above the critical altitude proved dangerous if not nearly impossible due to inherent instability. The flight test report further identified a range of control problems.

=== Cancellation ===
Before modifications could be achieved, funding ran out in March 1961. Frost's proposals for a modified design were not accepted, and the Avrocar and related WS-606A supersonic VTOL programs were officially cancelled in December 1961 by the U.S. military. Avro company executives encouraged additional VTOL research projects, exploring new configurations married to a disk platform and even a "lift jet" version, but no further interest resulted from Canadian or other sources, to cap the end of this Special Projects Group program. In 1961, a number of later proposals, including the Avro P470 VTOL fighter concept derived from the Special Projects Group, were submitted to fulfill a NATO competition for a tactical strike fighter. These needs were filled by the Hawker Siddeley Harrier, but in more general terms, interest in VTOL faded as it became widely believed a nuclear first strike would not be used at the start of a European war.

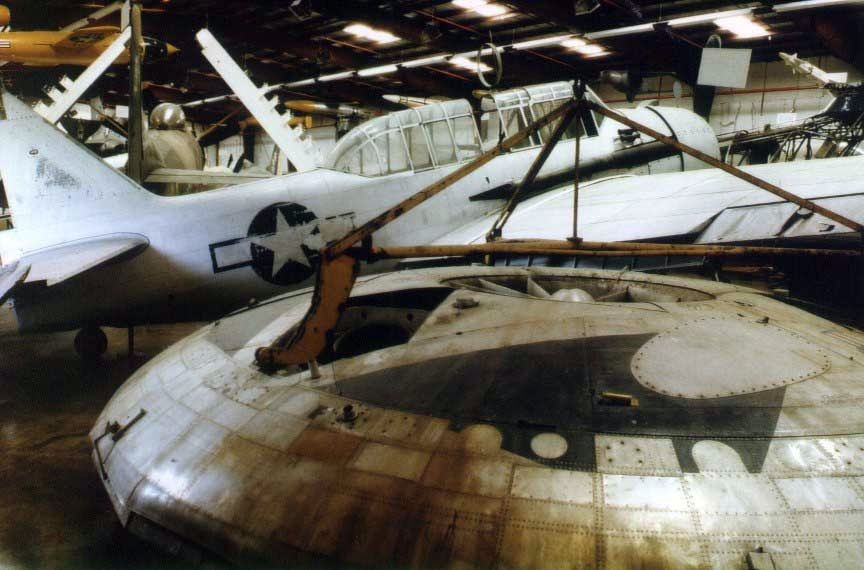
Avro VZ-9-AV Avrocar at the Paul E. Garber Preservation, Restoration and Storage Facility, National Air and Space Museum c.1984

The second Avrocar had logged about 75 flight hours at the end of the flight testing. Judged by its performance, the Avrocar was an abject failure: it could not lift itself safely more than a few feet off the ground, and its bulbous design, limiting its high-speed performance, accompanied by unbearable heat and screaming exhaust noise, made it impractical for the military. Although considered a technical failure, its design would be prophetic: it was a rubber skirt shy of being one of the world's first hovercraft, the Saunders Roe SR.N1 also taking off in 1959. Nevertheless, company designer John Frost applied for a number of patents in Canada, the UK and the U.S. that established the pivotal role that the Avrocar and related Avro experimental vehicles made in the VTOL world.

=== Latest developments ===
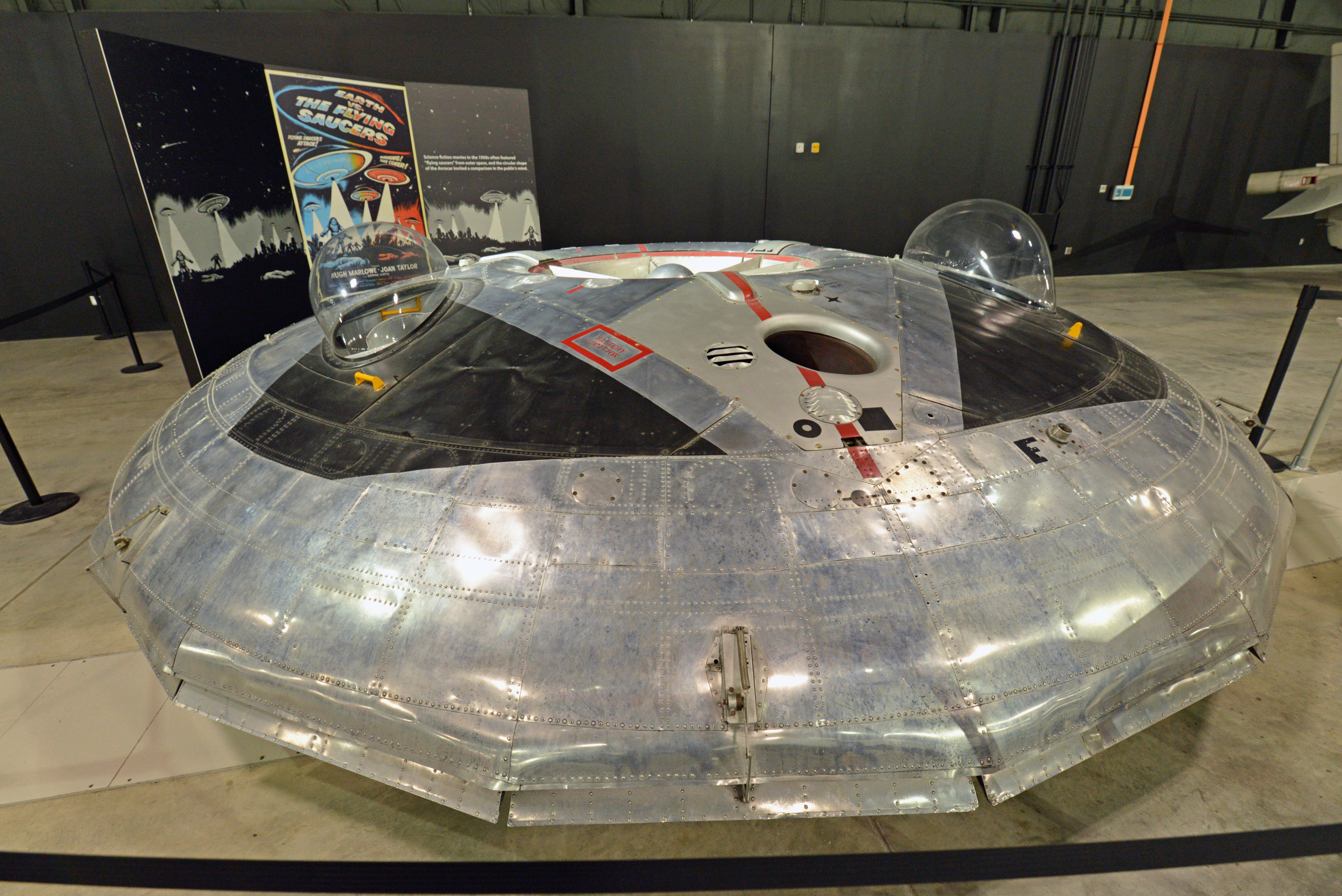
Avrocar at the National Museum of the USAF

The Avro VZ-9 Avrocar was a "dead end" in VTOL design, according to Russell Lee, curator at the National Air and Space Museum, yet its technological innovations have intrigued other designers. One of the design elements it embodied, the use of ducted fans, led to other experimental programs. Dr. Paul Moller, a Canadian expatriate who had worked at Avro Canada as a young engineer, based an initial series of experimental VTOL vehicles on "saucer" technology utilizing the buried ducted fan à la-Avrocar. The XM-2, the first of the series looked remarkably like a miniature flying saucer. After successful tether tests, the saucer designs also at one time publicized as "discojet" were abandoned and their latest project, the Moller Skycar, has a flying-car appearance.

The Avrocar story did not end with the termination of the program. Only two Avrocars were ever produced and because the U.S. military had paid for the work, they reverted to U.S. ownership at the end of the program. The second example, S/N 59-4975, utilized for "flight" testing, returned to Canada briefly for display in Montreal at the Man and His World Exhibition (1968); after a lengthy period of outdoor display, it is now under restoration at the U.S. Army Transportation Museum in Fort Eustis, Virginia.

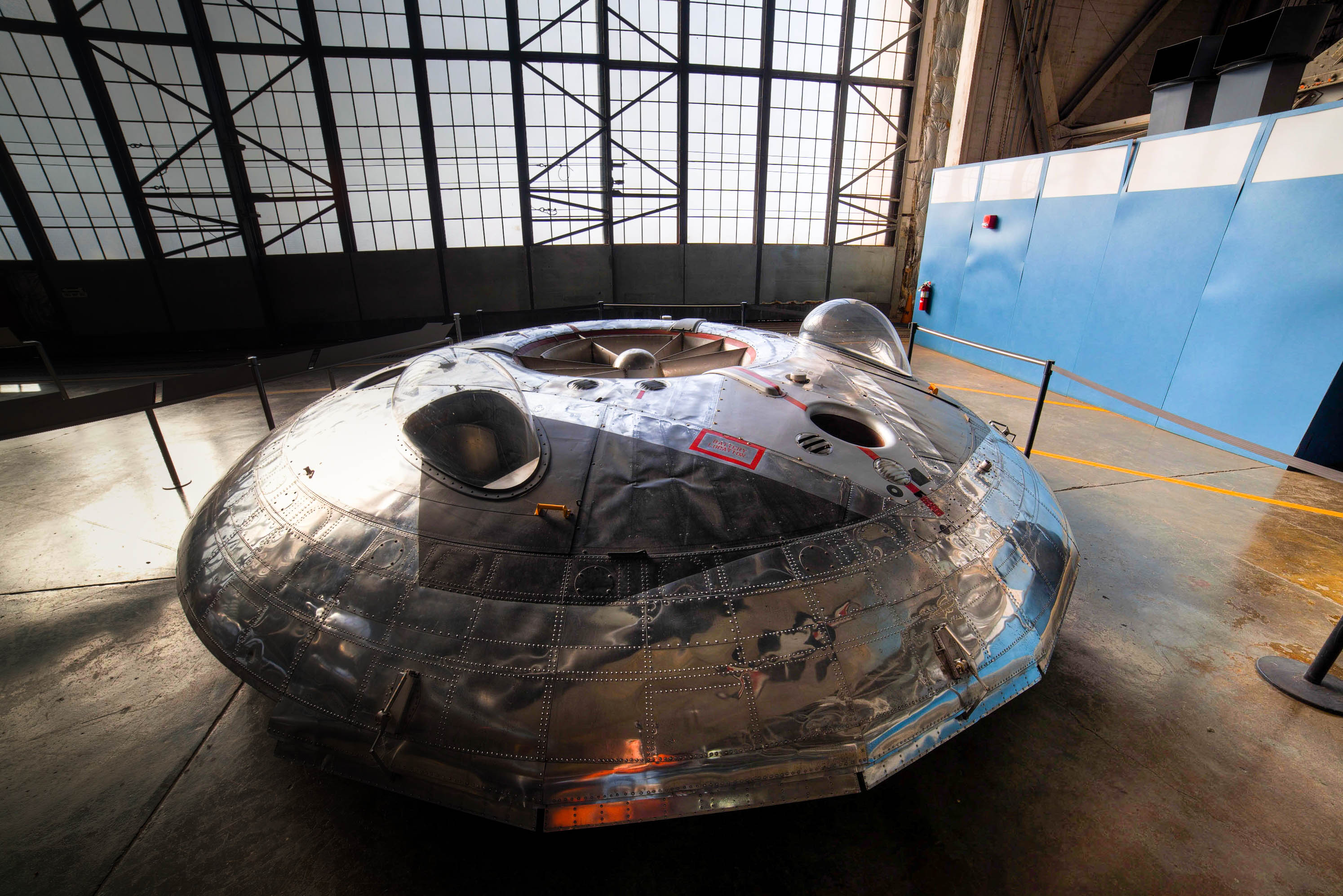
Avrocar at the National Museum of the United States Air Force in Dayton, Ohio

The first Avrocar, S/N 58-7055 (marked AV-7055), after tethered testing, became the "wind tunnel" test model at NASA Ames, where it remained in storage from 1961 until 1966, when it was donated to the National Air and Space Museum, being placed into storage at the Smithsonian's Paul E. Garber Preservation, Restoration, and Storage Facility in Suitland, Maryland. There it continued gathering dust for the next 40 years. The museum finally scheduled it for restoration and display at their newly constructed Steven F. Udvar-Hazy Center. Instead the Avrocar has been loaned to the National Museum of the United States Air Force in Dayton, Ohio, arriving in November 2007. After a full restoration, which included fabrication of both missing plexiglass bubbles, it was put on display in June 2008 in the museum's Cold War Gallery. It has since been moved to the Presidential Aircraft Gallery. In 2016, the Avrocar was moved to the museum's Research and Development Gallery in its new fourth hangar.

A full-scale replica of the Avrocar was prepared for the 2002 production, Avrocar: Saucer Secrets from the Past. It now resides as an exhibit at the Royal Aviation Museum of Western Canada, Winnipeg, Manitoba, Canada.

== Specifications (VZ-9-AV) ==
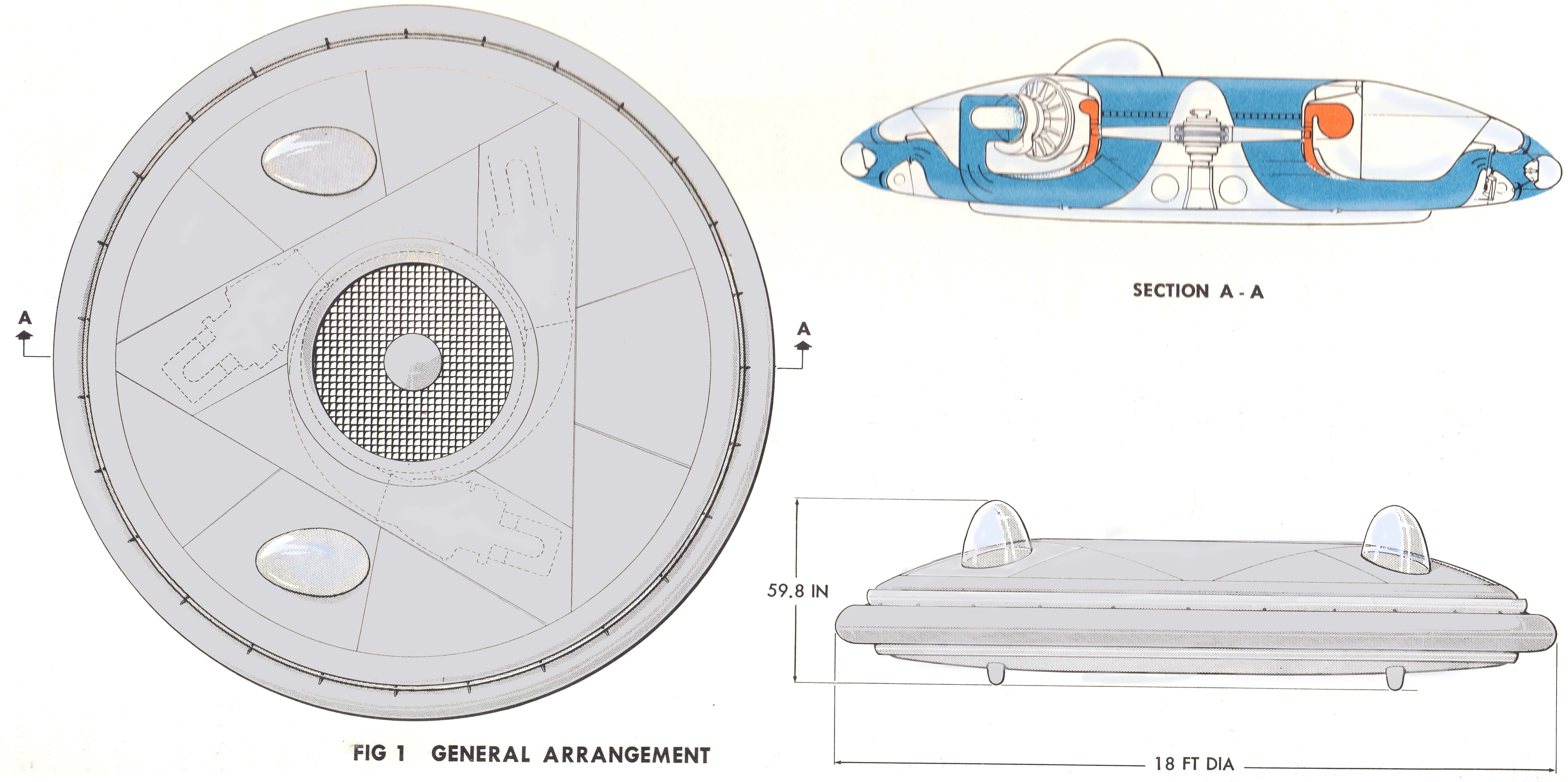
Avrocar 3-view drawing

Data from Avrocar: Canada's Flying Saucer... and The World's Worst Aircraft: From Pioneering Failures to Multimillion Dollar Disasters

General characteristics

- Crew: 2
- Capacity: 1 observer/engineer
- Diameter: 18 ft (5.5 m)
- Height: 3 ft 6 in (1.07 m)
- Wing area: 254 sq ft (23.6 m^{2})
- Empty weight: 3,000 lb (1,361 kg)
- Max takeoff weight: 5,560 lb (2,522 kg)
- Powerplant: 3 × Continental J69-T-9 turbojet engines, 660 lbf (2.9 kN) thrust each

Performance

- Maximum speed: 300 mph (480 km/h, 260 kn) (estimated), 35 mph (56 km/h) (actual)
- Range: 995 mi (1,601 km, 865 nmi) (estimated), 79 mi (127 km) (actual)
- Service ceiling: 10,000 ft (3,000 m) (estimated), 3 ft (0.91 m) (actual)

== See also ==
Aircraft of comparable role, configuration, and era

- Chrysler VZ-6
- Curtiss-Wright VZ-7
- Gyrodyne GCA-55
- Handley Page HP.120
- Piasecki VZ-8 Airgeep

== Notes ==
	Aerostat	Aerodyne		
	Lift: Lighter than air gas	Lift: Fixed wing	Lift: Unpowered rotor	Lift: Powered rotor
Unpowered free flight	(Free) balloon	Glider	Helicopter, etc. in autorotation	(None – see note 2)
Tethered (static or towed)	Tethered balloon	Kite	Rotor kite	(None – see note 2)
Powered	Airship	Airplane, ornithopter, etc.	Autogyro	Gyrodyne, helicopter
