= Bottom-up proteomics =

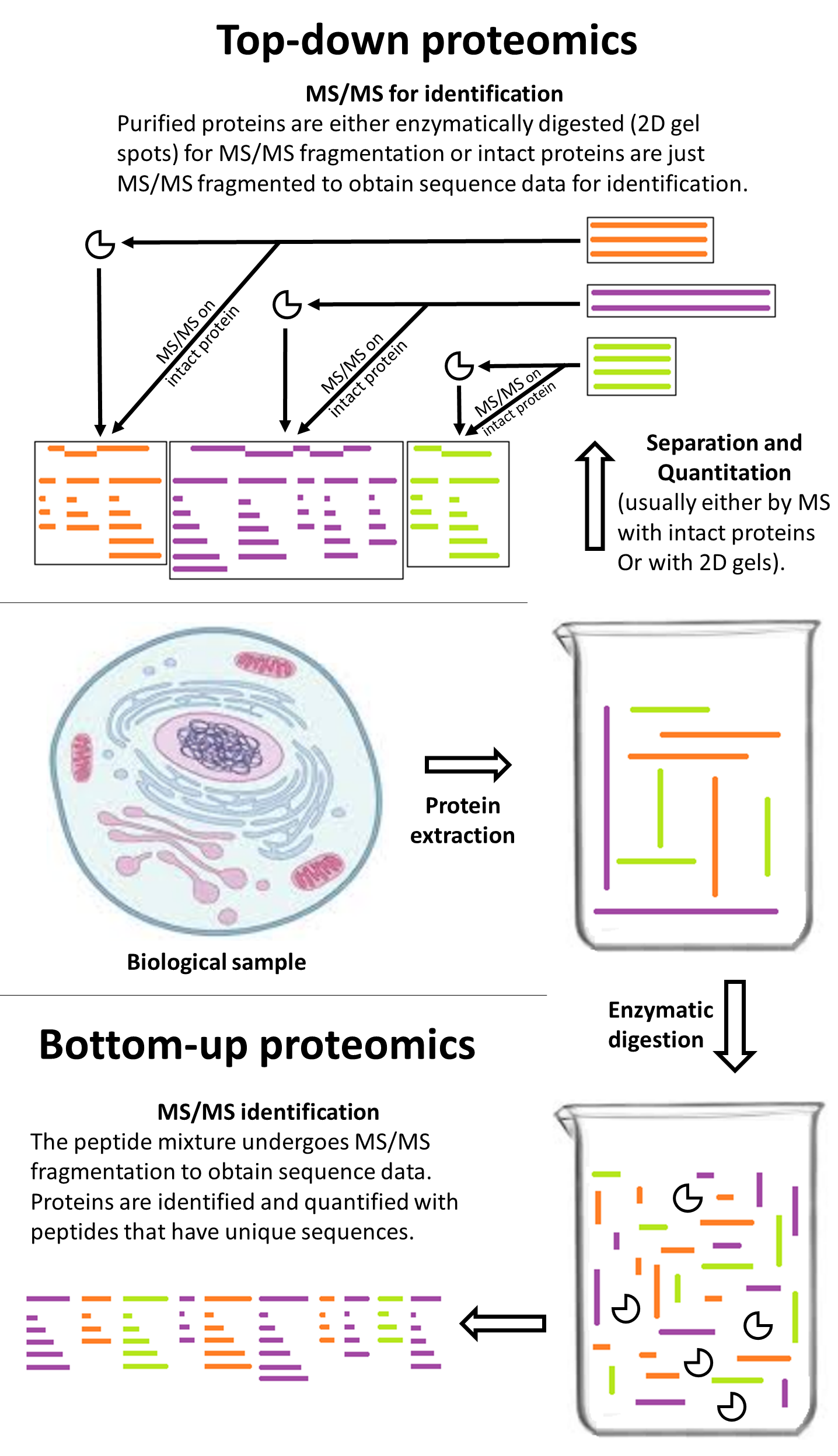
Top-down vs bottom-up proteomics

Bottom-up proteomics is a common method to identify proteins and characterize their amino acid sequences and post-translational modifications by proteolytic digestion of proteins prior to analysis by mass spectrometry. BUP techniques can be an alternative to MALDI-TOF MS approaches, as they allow the identification of bacterial strains and the characterization of potential resistance and virulence factors in a single run. The major alternative workflow used in high-throughput proteomics is called top-down proteomics and does not use proteolytic digestion. Essentially, bottom-up proteomics is a relatively simple and reliable means of determining the protein make-up of a given sample of cells, tissues, etc.

In bottom-up proteomics, the crude protein extract is enzymatically digested, followed by one or more dimensions of separation of the peptides by liquid chromatography coupled to mass spectrometry, a technique known as shotgun proteomics. By comparing the masses of the proteolytic peptides or their tandem mass spectra with those predicted from a sequence database or annotated peptide spectral in a peptide spectral library, peptides can be identified and multiple peptide identifications assembled into a protein identification.

== Advantages ==
For high throughput bottom-up methods, there is better front-end separation of peptides compared with proteins and higher sensitivity than the (non-gel) top-down methods.

== Disadvantages ==
There is limited protein sequence coverage by identified peptides, loss of labile PTMs, and ambiguity of the origin for redundant peptide sequences.

== See also ==
- Protein mass spectrometry
- Shotgun proteomics
- Peptide mass fingerprinting
- Top-down proteomics
