= Matrix (mass spectrometry) =

In mass spectrometry, a matrix is a compound that promotes the formation of ions. Matrix compounds are used in matrix-assisted laser desorption/ionization (MALDI), matrix-assisted ionization (MAI), and fast atom bombardment (FAB).

== Matrix-assisted laser desorption/ionization ==
MALDI is an ionization technique where laser energy is absorbed by a matrix to create ions from large molecules without fragmentation. The matrix, typically in excess, is mixed with the analyte molecule and deposited on a target. A table of matrix compounds, their structures, laser wavelengths typically used, and typical application is shown below.

MALDI Matrix List
Compound	Abbreviation	Structure	Wavelength (nm)	Applications
9-aminoacridine	9AA		337	lipids, metabolites
α-cyano-4-hydroxycinnamic acid	CHCA		337, 355	peptides, lipids, nucleotides
ferulic acid	FA		337, 355, 266	proteins
2,5-dihydroxy benzoic acid|	DHB		337, 355	peptides, nucleotides, oligonucleotides, oligosaccharides
3-hydroxy picolinic acid	HPA		337, 355	oligonucleotides
picolinic acid	PA		266	oligonucleotides
sinapinic acid	SA		337, 355, 266	peptides, proteins, lipids

== Matrix-assisted ionization ==
Matrix-assisted ionization is an ionization method in mass spectrometry that creates ions via the creation of particles at atmospheric pressure and transfer to the vacuum of the mass analyzer.

List of Matrix-assisted Ionization Compounds
Compound	Abbreviation	Structure
2,5-dihydroxybenzoic acid	DHB	
2-aminobenzyl alcohol		
anthranilic acid		
2-hydroxyacetophenone		

== Fast atom bombardment ==
FAB uses a high energy beam of atoms directed at a surface to create ions. FAB matrix compounds are typically liquids.

FAB Matrix List
Compound	Abbreviation	Structure
glycerol		
thioglycerol		
3-nitrobenzyl alcohol	NBA	
18-crown-6 ether		
2-nitrophenyloctyl ether	NPOE	
diethanolamine		
triethanolamine		

== See also ==
- Desorption/ionization on silicon
