= C6H5NO3 =

The molecular formula C_{6}H_{5}NO_{3} (molar mass: 139.11 g/mol, exact mass: 139.0269 u) may refer to:

- 3-Hydroxypicolinic acid
- 4-Nitrophenol
