= Mass spectrometry imaging =

Mass spectrometry technique that can visualize the spatial distribution of molecules

Mass spectrometry imaging (MSI) is a technique used in mass spectrometry to visualize the spatial distribution of molecules, as biomarkers, metabolites, peptides or proteins by their molecular masses. After collecting a mass spectrum at one spot, the sample is moved to reach another region, and so on, until the entire sample is scanned. By choosing a peak in the resulting spectra that corresponds to the compound of interest, the MS data is used to map its distribution across the sample. This results in pictures of the spatially resolved distribution of a compound pixel by pixel. Each data set contains a veritable gallery of pictures because any peak in each spectrum can be spatially mapped.

Despite the fact that MSI has been generally considered a qualitative method, the signal generated by this technique is proportional to the relative abundance of the analyte. Therefore, quantification is possible, when its challenges are overcome. Although widely used traditional methodologies like radiochemistry and immunohistochemistry achieve the same goal as MSI, they are limited in their abilities to analyze multiple samples at once, and can prove to be lacking if researchers do not have prior knowledge of the samples being studied. Most common ionization technologies in the field of MSI are DESI imaging, MALDI imaging, secondary ion mass spectrometry imaging (SIMS imaging) and Nanoscale SIMS (NanoSIMS).

== History ==
More than 50 years ago, MSI was introduced using secondary ion mass spectrometry (SIMS) to study semiconductor surfaces by Castaing and Slodzian. However, it was the pioneering work of Richard Caprioli and colleagues in the late 1990s, demonstrating how matrix-assisted laser desorption/ionization (MALDI) could be applied to visualize large biomolecules (as proteins and lipids) in cells and tissue to reveal the function of these molecules and how function is changed by diseases like cancer, which led to the widespread use of MSI. Nowadays, different ionization techniques have been used, including SIMS, MALDI and desorption electrospray ionization (DESI), as well as other technologies. Still, MALDI is the current dominant technology with regard to clinical and biological applications of MSI.

== Operation principle ==
The MSI is based on the spatial distribution of the sample. Therefore, the operation principle depends on the technique that is used to obtain the spatial information. The two techniques used in MSI are: microprobe and microscope.

=== Microprobe ===
This technique is performed using a focused ionization beam to analyze a specific region of the sample by generating a mass spectrum. The mass spectrum is stored along with the spatial coordination where the measurement took place. Then, a new region is selected and analyzed by moving the sample or the ionization beam. These steps are repeated until the entire sample has been scanned. By coupling all individual mass spectra, a distribution map of intensities as a function of x and y locations can be plotted. As a result, reconstructed molecular images of the sample are obtained.

=== Microscope ===
In this technique, a 2D position-sensitive detector is used to measure the spatial origin of the ions generated at the sample surface by the ion optics of the instruments. The resolution of the spatial information will depend on the magnification of the microscope, the quality of the ions optics and the sensitivity of the detector. A new region still needs to be scanned, but the number of positions drastically reduces. The limitation of this mode is the finite depth of vision present with all microscopes.

== Ion source dependence ==
The ionization techniques available for MSI are suited to different applications. Some of the criteria for choosing the ionization method are the sample preparation requirement and the parameters of the measurement, as resolution, mass range and sensitivity. Based on that, the most common used ionization method are MALDI, SIMS AND DESI which are described below. Still, other minor techniques used are laser ablation electrospray ionization (LAESI), laser-ablation-inductively coupled plasma (LA-ICP) and nanospray desorption electrospray ionization (nano-DESI).

=== SIMS and NanoSIMS imaging ===
Secondary ion mass spectrometry (SIMS) is used to analyze solid surfaces and thin films by sputtering the surface with a focused primary ion beam and collecting and analyzing ejected secondary ions. There are many different sources for a primary ion beam. However, the primary ion beam must contain ions that are at the higher end of the energy scale. Some common sources are: Cs^{+}, O_{2}^{+}, O, Ar^{+} and Ga^{+}. SIMS imaging is performed in a manner similar to electron microscopy; the primary ion beam is emitted across the sample while secondary mass spectra are recorded. SIMS proves to be advantageous in providing the highest image resolution but only over small area of samples. More, this technique is widely regarded as one of the most sensitive forms of mass spectrometry as it can detect elements in concentrations as small as 10^{12}-10^{16} atoms per cubic centimeter. (Note: by way of comparison, 1 cc of Carbon (diamond) contains about 1.8 × 10^{23} atoms. 10^{12} to 10^{16} corresponds to 6 parts per trillion (ppt) to 60 parts per billion (ppb).) (Note: the sensitivity varies by element (or molecule) as well as by nature of the surface being analyzed and conditions of the analysis.)

Multiplexed ion beam imaging (MIBI) is a SIMS method that uses metal isotope labeled antibodies to label compounds in biological samples.

Developments within SIMS: Some chemical modifications have been made within SIMS to increase the efficiency of the process. There are currently two separate techniques being used to help increase the overall efficiency by increasing the sensitivity of SIMS measurements: matrix-enhanced SIMS (ME-SIMS) - This has the same sample preparation as MALDI does as this simulates the chemical ionization properties of MALDI. ME-SIMS does not sample nearly as much material. However, if the analyte being tested has a low mass value then it can produce a similar looking spectra to that of a MALDI spectra. ME-SIMS has been so effective that it has been able to detect low mass chemicals at sub cellular levels that was not possible prior to the development of the ME-SIMS technique. The second technique being used is called sample metallization (Meta-SIMS) - This is the process of gold or silver addition to the sample. This forms a layer of gold or silver around the sample and it is normally no more than 1-3 nm thick. Using this technique has resulted in an increase of sensitivity for larger mass samples. The addition of the metallic layer also allows for the conversion of insulating samples to conducting samples, thus charge compensation within SIMS experiments is no longer required.

Subcellular (50 nm) resolution is enabled by NanoSIMS allowing for absolute quantitative analysis at the organelle level.

=== MALDI imaging ===
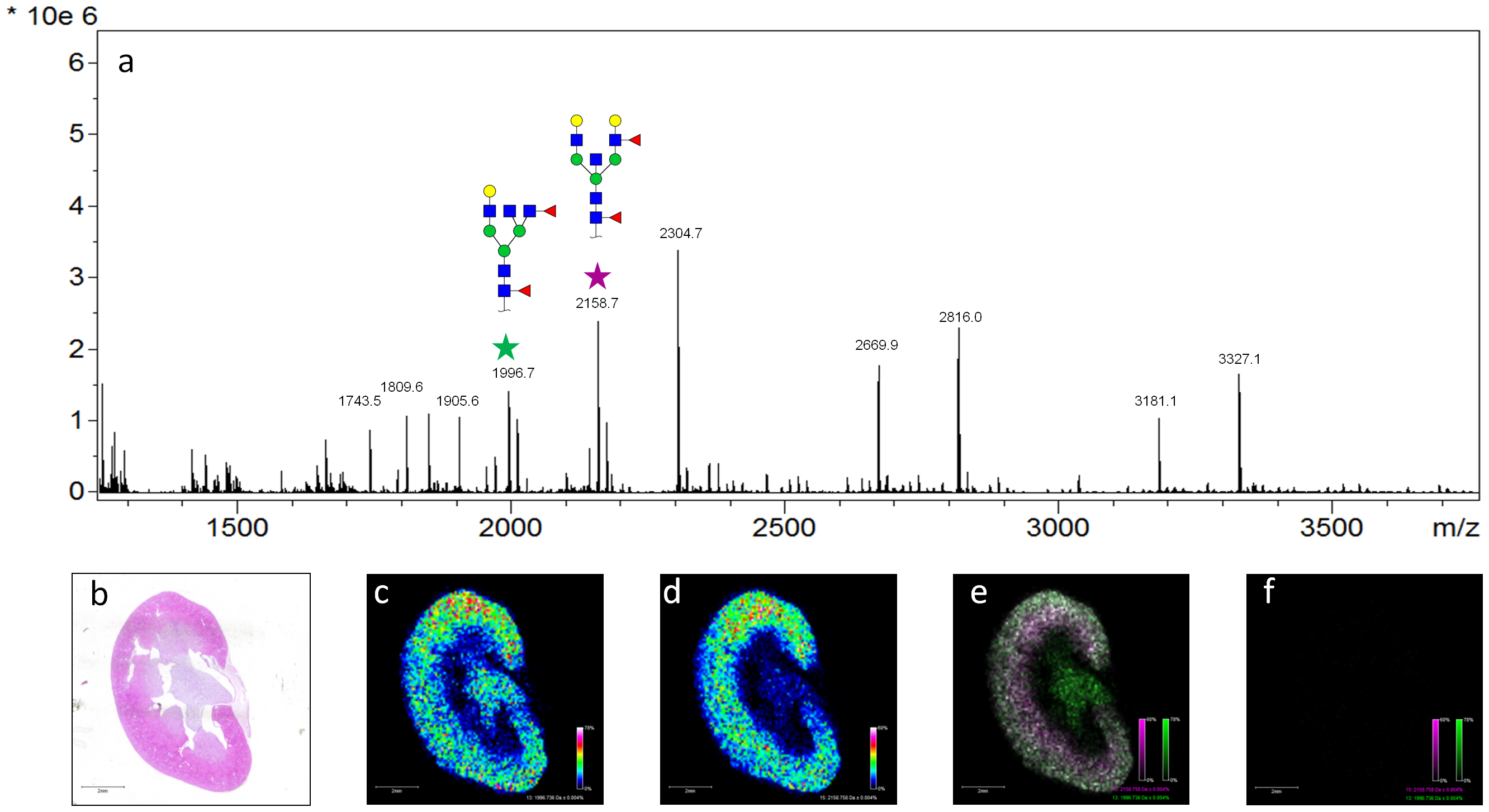
Mouse kidney: (a) MALDI spectra from the tissue. (b) H&E stained tissue. N-glycans at m/z = 1996.7 (c) is located in the cortex and medulla while m/z = 2158.7 (d) is in the cortex, (e) An overlay image of these two masses, (f) untreated control tissue.

Matrix-assisted laser desorption ionization can be used as a mass spectrometry imaging technique for relatively large molecules. It has recently been shown that the most effective type of matrix to use is an ionic matrix for MALDI imaging of tissue. In this version of the technique the sample, typically a thin tissue section, is moved in two dimensions while the mass spectrum is recorded. Although MALDI has the benefit of being able to record the spatial distribution of larger molecules, it comes at the cost of lower resolution than the SIMS technique. The limit for the lateral resolution for most of the modern instruments using MALDI is 20 $\mu$m. MALDI experiments commonly use either an Nd:YAG (355 nm) or N_{2} (337 nm) laser for ionization.

Pharmacodynamics and toxicodynamics in tissue have been studied by MALDI imaging.

=== DESI imaging ===
Desorption electrospray Ionization is a less destructive technique, which couples simplicity and rapid analysis of the sample. The sample is sprayed with an electrically charged solvent mist at an angle that causes the ionization and desorption of various molecular species. Then, two-dimensional maps of the abundance of the selected ions in the surface of the sample in relation with the spatial distribution are generated. This technique is applicable to solid, liquid, frozen and gaseous samples. Moreover, DESI allows analyzing a wide range of organic and biological compounds, as animal and plant tissues and cell culture samples, without complex sample preparation Although, this technique has the poorest resolution among other, it can create high-quality image from a large area scan, as a whole body section scanning.

Nano-DESI imaging

Nanospray Desoprtion Electrospray Ionization is a minimally destructive soft ionization technique based on liquid extraction. The basic setup consists of two fused silica capillaries (primary and secondary). An extraction solvent is supplied through a primary capillary, forming a liquid bridge at the interface of the two capillaries and extracting molecules from the tissue surface. Afterwards, the extracted analytes are transferred and nebulized through the secondary capillary inside the inlet of a mass spectrometer. Nano-DESI offers great solvent versatility and the possibility of analyte quantification by introducing of internal standards directly into the solvent.

=== SICRIT imaging ===
The Soft Ionization by Chemical Reaction in Transfer (SICRIT) source can be coupled with imaging techniques such as Atmospheric pressure (AP)-MALDI or laser ablation. In AP-MALDI + SICRIT configurations, SICRIT serves as an ambient-pressure post-ionization unit, increasing ion yield and extending molecular coverage, particularly for small metabolites and lipids. When combined with laser ablation, SICRIT enables soft ionization of ablated neutrals without matrix application, maintaining high spatial resolution down to ~1 μm. Recent studies demonstrate that coupling laser desorption with plasma-based SICRIT ionization improves ionization efficiency and signal stability under atmospheric conditions. The technique offers compatibility with various mass spectrometers and minimal sample preparation. Limitations include dependence on ablation parameters and limited coverage of large biomolecules. SICRIT imaging is an emerging approach promising enhanced molecular coverage and flexible ambient-MSI workflows.

=== Comparative between the ionization techniques ===
Comparison of typical parameters among MSI techniques
	Ionization Source	Type of Ionization	Analytes	Spatial Resolution	Mass Range
SIMS	Ion gun	Hard	Elemental ions, small molecules, lipids	<10 $\mu$m	0-1000 Da
MALDI	UV laser beam	Soft	Lipids, peptide, proteins	20 $\mu$m	0-100 000 Da
DESI	Solvent Spray	Soft	Small molecules, lipids, peptides	50 $\mu$m	0-2000 Da
Nano-DESI	Solvent liquid bridge	Soft	Small molecules, lipids, peptides	10 μm	0-2000 Da
MALDI + SICRIT	Cold Plasma	Soft	Small molecules, lipids, peptides	0,25μm	0-2000 Da
LA + SICRIT	Cold Plasma	Soft	Small molecules, lipids, nucleotids	< 5 μm	0-2000 Da

== Combination of various MSI techniques and other imaging techniques ==
Combining various MSI techniques can be beneficial, since each particular technique has its own advantage. For example, when information regards both proteins and lipids are necessary in the same tissue section, performing DESI to analyze the lipid, followed by MALDI to obtain information about the peptide, and finalize applying a stain (haematoxylin and eosin) for medical diagnosis of the structural characteristic of the tissue. On the other side of MSI with other imaging techniques, fluorescence staining with MSI and magnetic resonance imaging (MRI) with MRI can be highlighted. Fluorescence staining can give information of the appearance of some proteins present in any process inside a tissue, while MSI may give information about the molecular changes presented in that process. Combining both techniques, multimodal picture or even 3D images of the distribution of different molecules can be generated.

Recent work has demonstrated that transmission-mode MALDI-2 combined with fluorescence microscopy on the same tissue section enables single-cell-resolved MSI and precise co-registration with the optical modality. In contrast, MRI with MSI combines the continuous 3D representation of MRI image with detailed structural representation using molecular information from MSI. Even though, MSI itself can generate 3D images, the picture is just part of the reality due to the depth limitation in the analysis, while MRI provides, for example, detailed organ shape with additional anatomical information. This coupled technique can be beneficial for cancer precise diagnosis and neurosurgery.

== Data processing ==
=== Standard data format for mass spectrometry imaging datasets ===
The imzML was proposed to exchange data in a standardized XML file based on the mzML format. Several imaging MS software tools support it. The advantage of this format is the flexibility to exchange data between different instruments and data analysis software.

=== Software ===
There are many free software packages available for visualization and mining of imaging mass spectrometry data. Converters from Thermo Fisher format, Analyze format, GRD format and Bruker format to imzML format were developed by the Computis project. Some software modules are also available for viewing mass spectrometry images in imzML format: Biomap (Novartis, free), Datacube Explorer (AMOLF, free), EasyMSI (CEA), Mirion (JLU), MSiReader (NCSU, free) and SpectralAnalysis.

For processing .imzML files with the free statistical and graphics language R, a collection of R scripts is available, which permits parallel-processing of large files on a local computer, a remote cluster or on the Amazon cloud.

Another free statistical package for processing imzML and Analyze 7.5 data in R exists, Cardinal.

SPUTNIK is an R package containing various filters to remove peaks characterized by an uncorrelated spatial distribution with the sample location or spatial randomness.

The Python ecosystem provides a range of specialized libraries for processing mass spectrometry data, serving distinct analytical needs. For comprehensive, end-to-end workflows, pyOpenMS offers extensive Python bindings for the C++ OpenMS library, facilitating complex operations such as signal processing, feature finding, and quantification. In contrast, pymzML is a highly efficient, lightweight parser optimized specifically for rapid data extraction and interaction with mzML files, making it ideal for prototyping and targeted data access. Pyteomics also functions as a versatile and lightweight toolkit, but supports a broader range of common proteomics formats (including mgf and pepxml) and is often utilized for its ease of use in general data handling and calculations. For more specific applications, matchms is a focused library dedicated to data processing, cleaning, and comparison, particularly for implementing various spectral similarity scoring algorithms essential in metabolomics.

== Applications ==
A remarkable ability of MSI is to find out the localization of biomolecules in tissues, even though there are no previous information about them. This feature has made MSI a unique tool for clinical research and pharmacological research. It provides information about biomolecular changes related with diseases by tracking proteins, lipids, and cell metabolism. For example, identifying biomarkers by MSI can show detailed cancer diagnosis. In addition, low cost imaging for pharmaceuticals studies can be acquired, such as images of molecular signatures that would be indicative of treatment response for a specific drug or the effectiveness of a particular drug delivery method.

Ion colocalization has been studied as a way to infer local interactions between biomolecules. Similarly to colocalization in microscopy imaging, correlation has been used to quantify the similarity between ion images and generate network models.

== Advantages, challenges and limitations ==
The main advantage of MSI for studying the molecules location and distribution within the tissue is that this analysis can provide either greater selectivity, more information or more accuracy than others. Moreover, this tool requires less investment of time and resources for similar results. The table below shows a comparison of advantages and disadvantages of some available techniques, including MSI, correlated with drug distribution analysis.

Comparison of advantages and disadvantages of techniques assessing drug distribution
Methodology	Question answered	Advantages	Disadvantages
Autoradiography	Where and how much radioactivity	Very high spatial resolution; reliable quantitation	Ex vivo; requires radio-labelled drug; does not distinguish drug from metabolites.
Immunohistochemistry	Where	Short processing time; easy interpretation; inexpensive	Ex vivo; requires antibodies, which vary in sensitivity and specificity; difficulties assigning; detection threshold; lack of standard scoring system
Fluorescence	Where	In vivo possible; reasonable cost	Not quantitative; poor resolution; autofluorescent interference
Positron emission tomography (PET)	Where, what and activity	In vivo possible; good resolution; can be coupled to CT X-ray, gamma camera	Expensive; short-lived isotopes; need cyclotron to produce isotopes
Coherent anti-Stokes Raman scattering microscopy (CARS)	Where and what	Label-free; sub-cellular spatial resolution	Not quantitative; poor selectivity; high background noise
Electrochemical atomic force microscopy (AFM)	Where and what	Label-free imaging; high resolution	Not quantitative; poor reproducibility; high background
MSI	Where and what	Multiplex; label-free imaging; good spatial resolution	Semi-quantitative; ion-suppression effects; complex analysis
