= C10H7NO3 =

The molecular formula C_{10}H_{7}NO_{3} (molar mass: 189.168 g/mol) may refer to:

- α-Cyano-4-hydroxycinnamic acid
- Kynurenic acid, a product of the normal metabolism of amino acid L-tryptophan
