= CHCA =

CHCA may refer to:

- CHCA-TV, a defunct television station (channel 6) licensed to Red Deer, Alberta, Canada
- Child Health Corporation of America, a business alliance of child-care hospitals, headquartered in Shawnee Mission, Kansas
- The Collier Heights Community Association (CHCA), a community association in Atlanta, Georgia, USA
- The Colorado Hill Climb Association, the group which organizes and supports motorized hill-climbing races in Colorado, USA
- Community Health Charities of America, a non-profit organization headquartered in Arlington, Virginia, USA
- Cincinnati Hills Christian Academy, a private university preparatory school in Cincinnati, Ohio, USA
- α-Cyano-4-hydroxycinnamic acid, a phenylpropanoid used as a matrix for peptides and nucleotides in matrix-assisted laser desorption/ionization mass spectrometry analyses

== See also ==
- Chimpanzee-human last common ancestor (CHLCA)
