= Protein fingerprinting =

Protein fingerprinting can refer to any of the several methods for identifying or differentiating proteins:

- Peptide mass fingerprinting, a method developed in 1993 that uses protein mass spectrometry following SDS-PAGE
- Older techniques using two-dimensional chromatography and/or protein electrophoresis
