= Michael Barber (chemist) =

British chemist and mass spectrometrist

FRS Michael Barber
- Born: 3 November 1934; Newton, Cheshire, England
- Died: 8 May 1991 (aged 56)
- Other name: Micky
- Education: Manchester Grammar School, Queen's College, Oxford
- Known for: Fast atom bombardment
- Spouse: Joan Barber (m. 1958; died 1991)
- Children: 3
- Scientific career
- Fields: Chemistry, mass spectrometry
- Doctoral advisor: John Wilfrid Linnett

Michael (Mickey) Barber, FRS (3 November 1934 – 8 May 1991) was a British chemist and mass spectrometrist, best known for his invention of fast atom bombardment ionisation.

== Biography ==
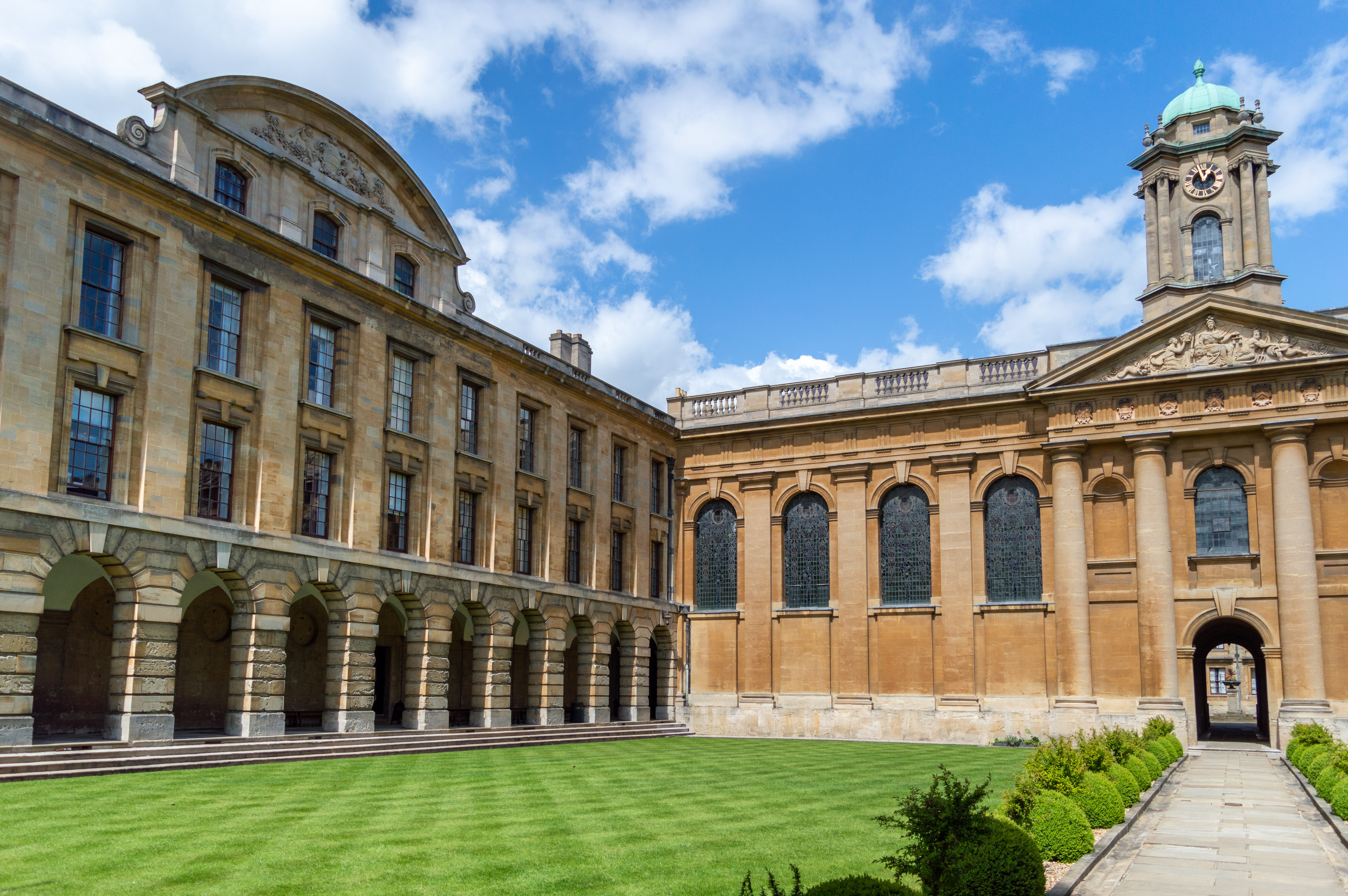
Front Quad, Queen's College, Oxford

On 3 November 1934, Barber was born at his family's home in Manchester at 166 Lodge Lane in Newton. His family were working-class and underprivileged. Barber was one of two boys; his brother Peter was born in 1927. His father, Joseph Barber, was a carpenter.

He went to Manchester Grammar School and was then educated at the Queen's College, Oxford, obtaining his B.A. in 1958 and his B.Sc. in 1959. There he worked with Jack Linnett and they designed and built a mass spectrometer for the analysis of flames. He married Joan Gaskell in 1958, the couple had three children.

In 1961 he returned to Manchester to work at the Scientific Instruments division of Associated Electrical Industries. There, he and Martin Elliott developed a method to study the fragmentation of ions with a mass spectrometer and started to work on X-ray photoelectron spectroscopy. In 1973 he took up a lectureship position at UMIST and was promoted to Professor in 1985. In the same year, 1985, he was also elected a Fellow of the Royal Society. He remained at Manchester until his death.

== Fast atom bombardment ==
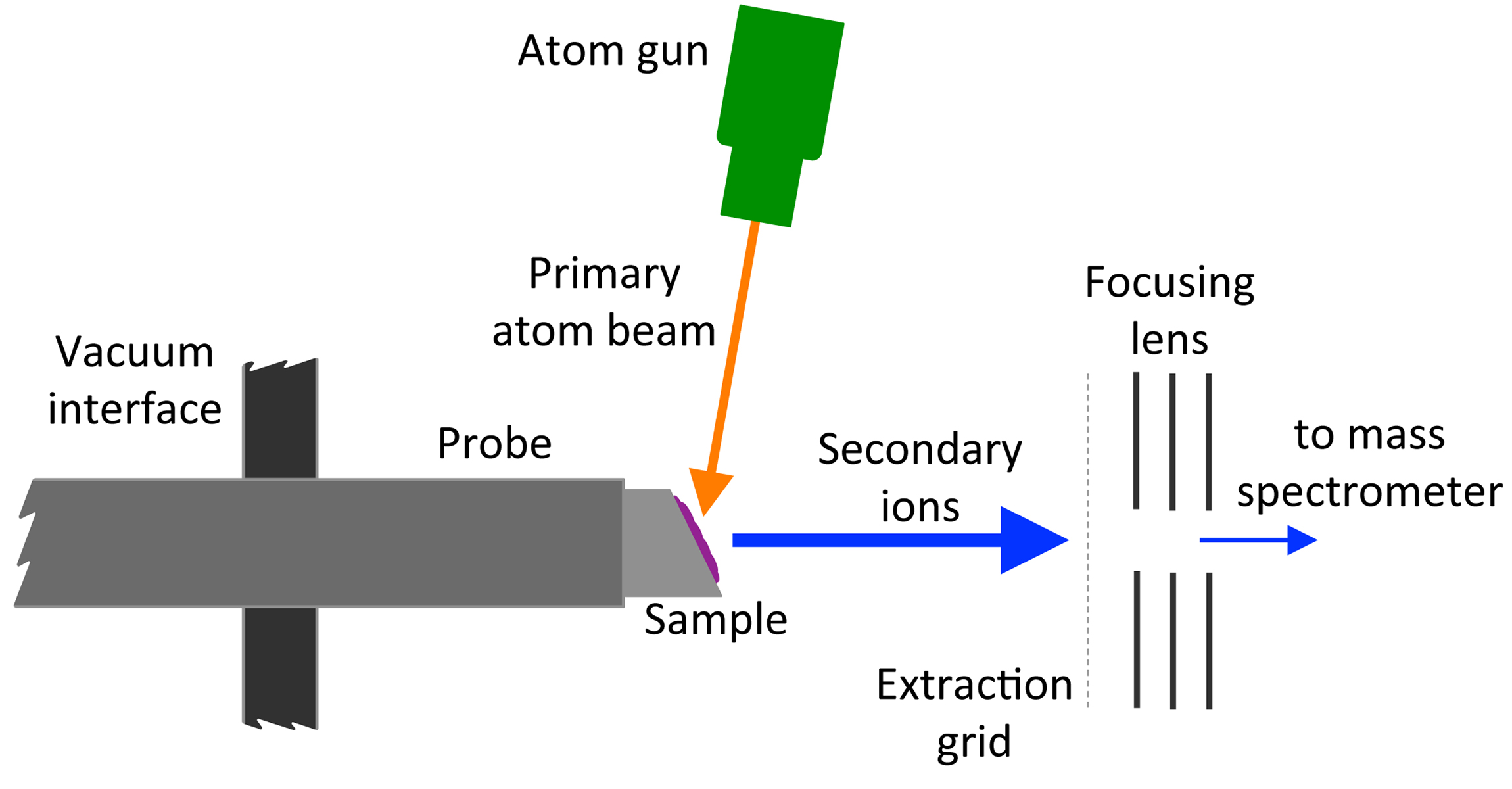
Schematic of a fast atom bombardment ion source for a mass spectrometer.

Fast atom bombardment (FAB) is a method of ionization used in mass spectrometry that uses a beam of high energy atoms strikes a surface to create ions. An energetic beam of atoms or ions will destroy an organic molecule under conditions typically used to create secondary ions. Barber realised that mixing the compound of interest with a vacuum compatible low-volatility liquid such as glycerol effectively protected the organic molecule and allowed it to be ionized and detected. The protecting liquid "matrix" allowed compounds as large as 10,000 Da molecular mass to be detected. The concept of a protecting matrix was later used in matrix-assisted laser desorption ionization. The FAB technique was employed by Barber, Howard Morris (biochemist) and co-workers for early peptide sequencing experiments.

== Honours and distinctions ==
- Royal Society of Chemistry Award for analytical chemistry and instrumentation (1979)
- Fellow of the Royal Society (1985)
- American Society for Mass Spectrometry – The Distinguished Contribution in Mass Spectrometry Award (1991)

The Michael Barber Centre for Collaborative Mass Spectrometry based at the University of Manchester, is named in honour of him.
