= Fast atom bombardment =

Ionization technique used in mass spectrometry

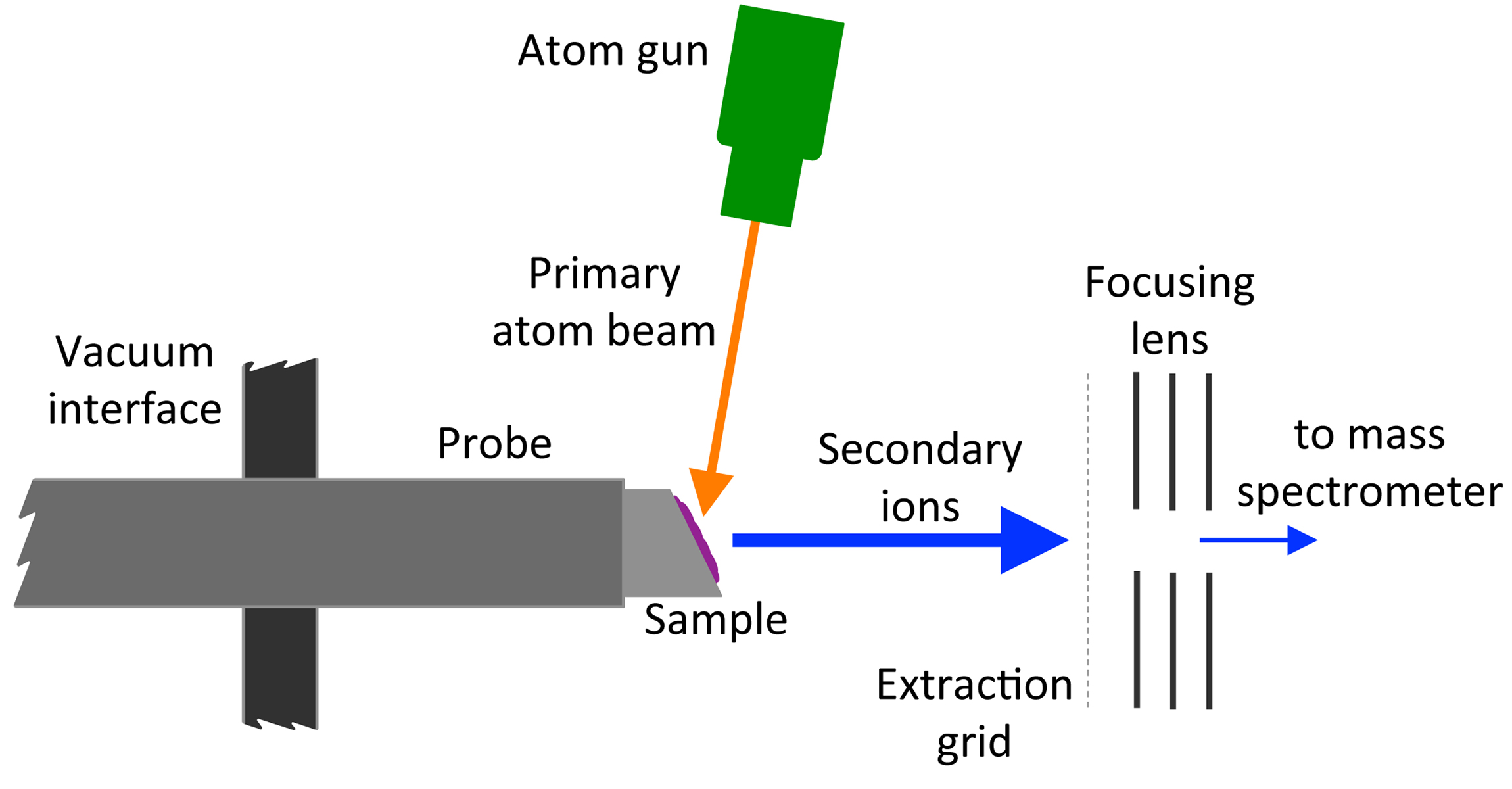
Schematic of a fast atom bombardment ion source for a mass spectrometer.

Fast atom bombardment (FAB) is an ionization technique used in mass spectrometry in which a beam of high energy atoms strikes a surface to create ions. It was developed by Michael Barber at the University of Manchester in 1980. When a beam of high energy ions is used instead of atoms (as in secondary ion mass spectrometry), the method is known as liquid secondary ion mass spectrometry (LSIMS). In FAB and LSIMS, the material to be analyzed is mixed with a non-volatile chemical protection environment, called a matrix, and is bombarded under vacuum with a high energy (4000 to 10,000 electron volts) atomic beam. The atoms are typically from an inert gas such as argon or xenon. Common matrices include glycerol, thioglycerol, 3-nitrobenzyl alcohol (3-NBA), 18-crown-6 ether, 2-nitrophenyloctyl ether, sulfolane, diethanolamine, and triethanolamine. This technique is similar to secondary ion mass spectrometry and plasma desorption mass spectrometry.

== Ionization mechanism ==
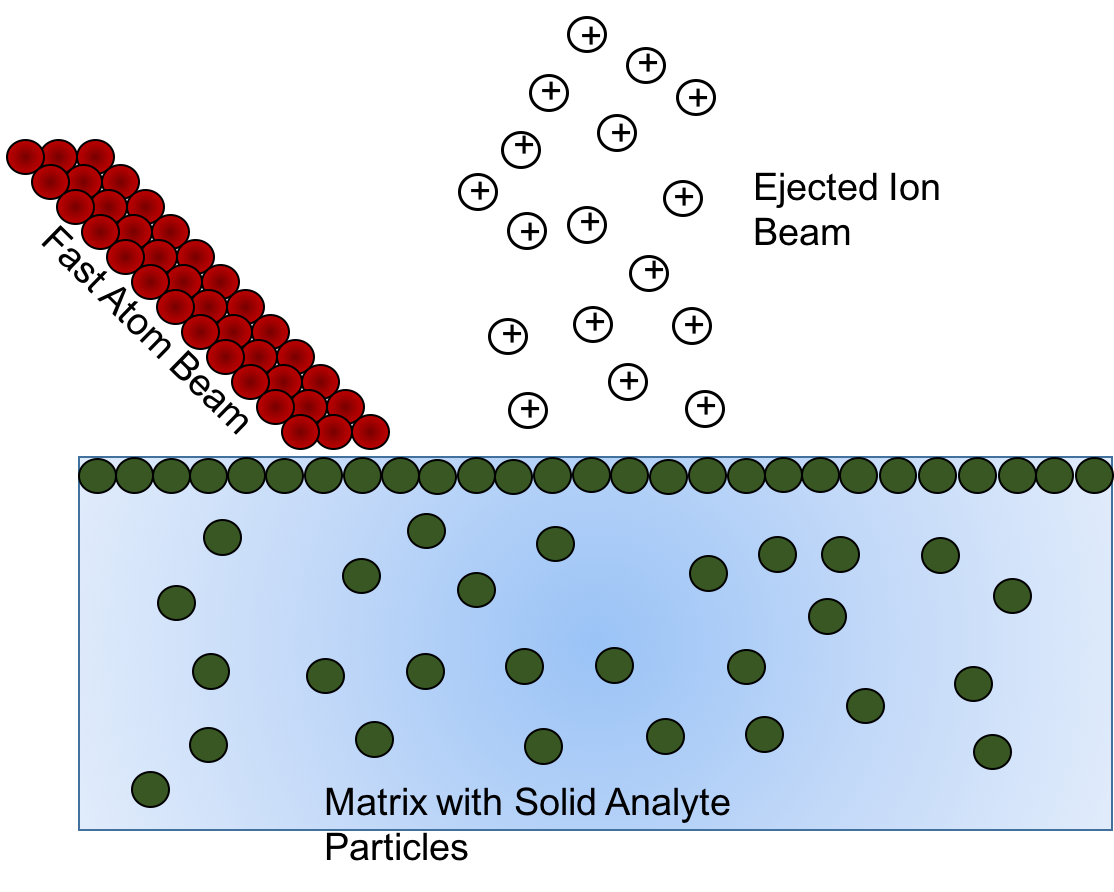
Schematic of the fast atom bombardment process.

FAB is a relatively low fragmentation (soft) ionization technique and produces primarily intact protonated molecules denoted as [M + H]^{+} and deprotonated molecules such as [M - H]^{−}. Radical cations can also be observed in a FAB spectrum in rare cases. FAB was designed as an improved version of SIMS that allowed for the primary beam to no longer cause damaging effects to the sample. The major difference between the two techniques is the difference in the nature of the primary beam used; ions vs atoms. For LSIMS, Cesium, Cs^{+} ions make up the primary beam and for FAB the primary beam is made up of Xe or Ar atoms. Xe atoms are used because they tend to be more sensitive than Argon atoms due to their larger masses and more momentum. For the molecules to be ionized by FAB, first the slow moving atoms (Xe or Ar) are ionized by colliding electrons. Those slow moving atoms are then ionized and accelerated to a certain potential where they develop into fast moving ions that become neutral in a dense cloud of excess natural gas atoms that make a flowing stream of high translational energy atoms. Although the exact mechanism of how the samples are ionized have not been fully discovered, the nature of its ionization mechanism is similar to matrix-assisted laser desorption/ionization (MALDI) and chemical ionization.

== Matrices and sample introduction ==
As previously stated, in FAB the samples are mixed with a non-volatile environment (matrix) in order to be analyzed. FAB uses a liquid matrix that is mixed with the sample in order to provide a sample ion current that is sustained, reduces damages made to the sample by absorbing the impact of the primary beam, and keeps the sample molecules form aggregating. The liquid matrix, like any other matrix, most importantly provides a medium that promotes sample ionization. The most widely accepted matrix for this type of ionization is glycerol. Choosing the appropriate matrix for the sample is crucial because the matrix can also influence the degree of fragmentation of the sample (analyte) ions. The sample can then be introduced to FAB analysis. The normal method of introducing the sample-matrix mixture is through an insertion probe. The sample-matrix mixture is loaded on a stainless steel sample target on the probe, which is then placed in the ion source via a vacuum lock. The alternative method of introducing the sample is by using a device called continuous flow fast atom bombardment (CF)-FAB.

== Continuous flow fast atom bombardment ==
In continuous flow fast atom bombardment (CF-FAB), the sample is introduced into the mass spectrometer insertion probe through a small diameter capillary. (CF)-FAB was developed to minimize the problem of poor detection sensitivity that is caused by an excess of the matrix background that results in a high matrix-to-sample ratio. When a metal frit is used to disperse the liquid on the probe, the technique is known as frit FAB. Samples can be introduced by flow injection, microdialysis, or by coupling with liquid chromatography. Flow rates are typically between 1 and 20 μL/min. CF-FAB has a higher sensitivity compared to static FAB

== Applications ==
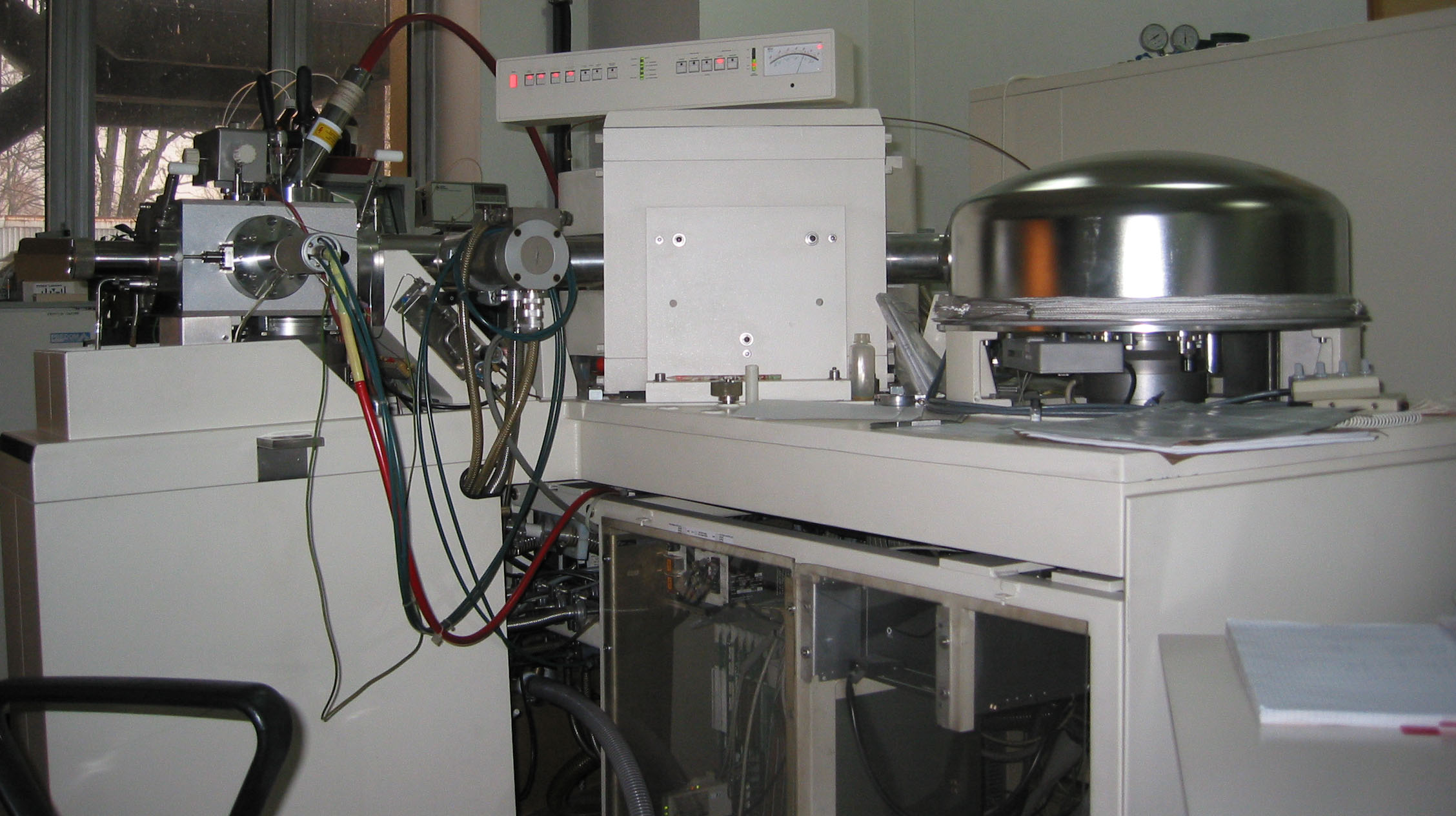
ThermoQuest AvantGarde MS with quadrupole detector and FAB/EI source.

The first example of the practical application of this FAB was the elucidation of the amino acid sequence of the oligopeptide efrapeptin D. This contained a variety of very unusual amino acid residues. The sequence was shown to be: N-acetyl-L-pip-AIB-L-pip-AIB-AIB-L-leu-beta-ala-gly-AIB-AIB-L-pip-AIB-gly-L-leu-L-iva-AIB-X. PIP = pipecolic acid, AIB = alpha-amino-isobutyric acid, leu = leucine, iva = isovaline, gly = glycine. This is a potent inhibitor of mitochondrial ATPase activity. Another application of FAB includes its original use for the analysis of condensed-phase samples. FAB can be use for measurements of the molecular weight of samples below 5000 Da, as well as their structural characteristics. FAB can be paired with various mass spectrometers for data analysis, such as with a quadrupole mass analyzer, liquid chromatography–mass spectrometry, and more.

== Inorganic analysis ==
In 1983 a paper was published describing the use of fast atom bombardment mass spectrometry (FAB-MS) to analyze isotopes of calcium. Glycerol was not used; samples in aqueous solution were deposited on the sample target and dried prior to analysis. The technique was effectively secondary ion mass spectrometry using a neutral primary beam. This was a welcomed development for biomedical researchers studying the nutrition and metabolism of essential minerals but lacking access to inorganic mass spectrometry instrumentation such as thermal ionization mass spectrometry or inductively-coupled plasma mass spectrometry (ICP-MS). In contrast, FAB mass spectrometers were widely found in biomedical research institutions. Multiple laboratories adopted this technique, using FAB-MS to measure isotope ratios in isotope tracer studies of calcium, iron, magnesium and zinc. The analysis of metals required minimal modification of the mass spectrometers, e.g.replacing the stainless steel sample targets with pure silver ones to eliminate background from ionization of stainless steel components. Signal acquisition systems were sometimes modified to perform peak jumping instead of scanning and to do ion counting detection. While satisfactory precision and accuracy were attained with FAB-MS, the technique was labor-intensive with a very low sample through-put rate due in part to the absence of auto-sampling options. By the early 2000s this severe sampling rate limitation had motivated users of FAB-MS for mineral isotope analysis to switch to conventional inorganic mass spectrometers, usually ICP-MS which also exhibited improved affordability and isotope ratio analysis performance by that time.
