= 1-(2-Nitrophenoxy)octane =

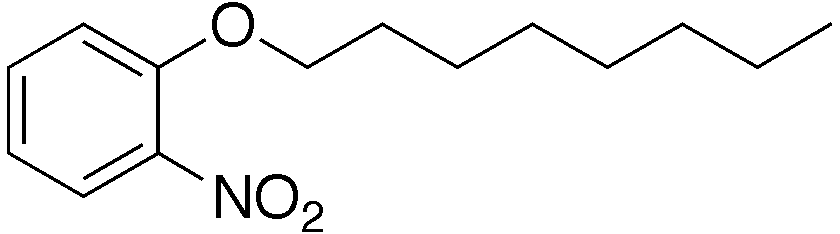

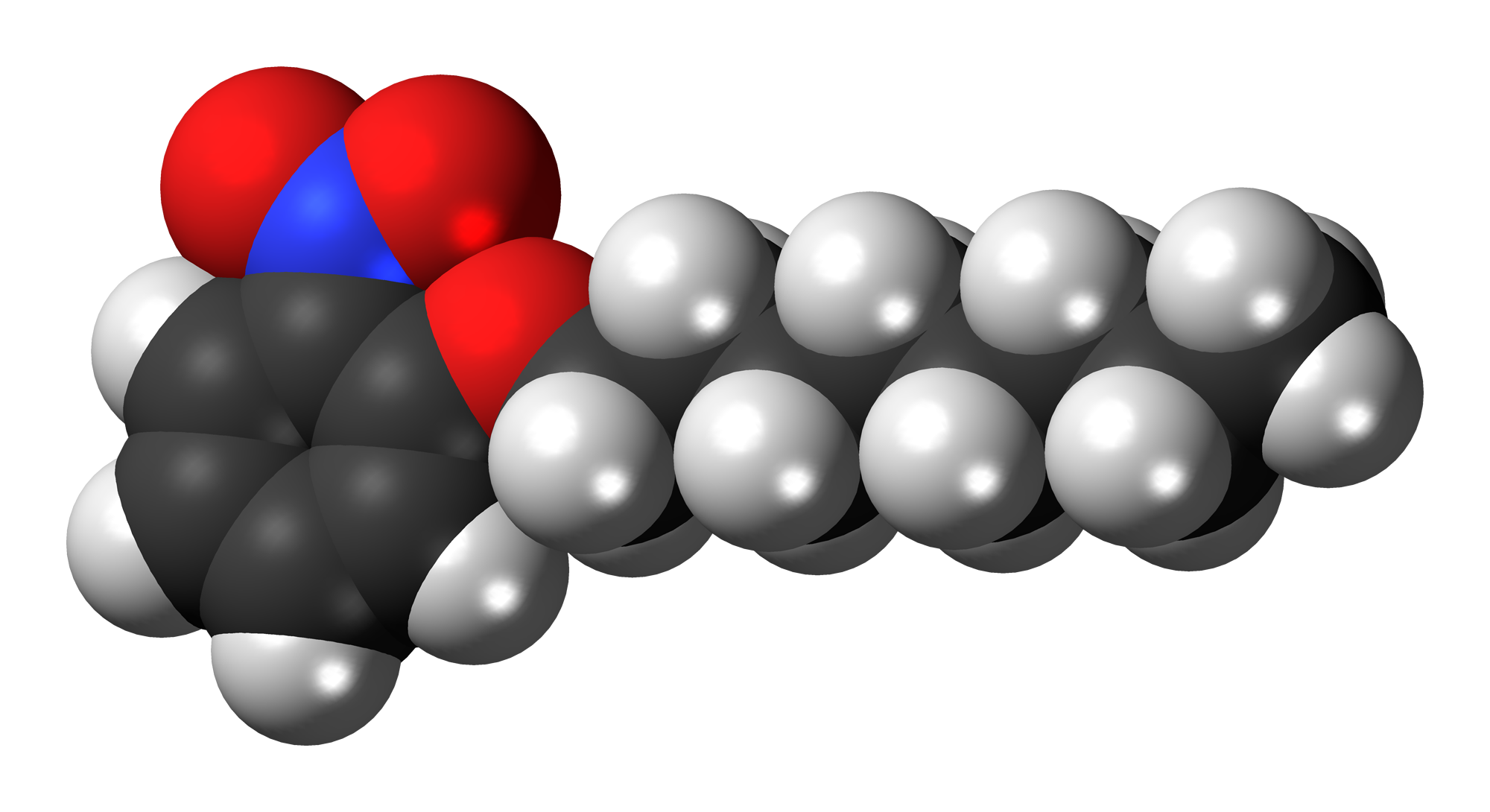

Names
- Preferred IUPAC name 1-Nitro-2-(octyloxy)benzene
- Other names 1-(2-Nitrophenoxy)octane; 2-Nitrophenyl octyl ether 1-Nitro-2-octoxy-benzene; 2-(Octyloxy)nitrobenzene; Octyl o-nitrophenyl ether

Identifiers
CAS Number	37682-29-4
3D model (JSmol)	Interactive image
Abbreviations	NPOE
ChemSpider	148623
ECHA InfoCard	100.048.731
PubChem CID	169952
UNII	4NSH6FFF2H
CompTox Dashboard (EPA)	DTXSID3068047
- InChI: InChI=1S/C14H21NO3/c1-2-3-4-5-6-9-12-18-14-11-8-7-10-13(14)15(16)17/h7-8,10-11H,2-6,9,12H2,1H3 Key: CXVOIIMJZFREMM-UHFFFAOYSA-N; InChI=1/C14H21NO3/c1-2-3-4-5-6-9-12-18-14-11-8-7-10-13(14)15(16)17/h7-8,10-11H,2-6,9,12H2,1H3 Key: CXVOIIMJZFREMM-UHFFFAOYAD
- SMILES: [O-][N+](=O)c1ccccc1OCCCCCCCC

Properties
Chemical formula	C_{14}H_{21}NO_{3}
Molar mass	251.321
Density	1.04 g/mL
Boiling point	197 to 198 °C (387 to 388 °F; 470 to 471 K) (11 mm Hg)
- Except where otherwise noted, data are given for materials in their standard state (at 25 °C [77 °F], 100 kPa). verify (what is ?) Infobox references

1-(2-Nitrophenoxy)octane, also known as nitrophenyl octyl ether and abbreviated NPOE, is a chemical compound that is used as a matrix in fast atom bombardment mass spectrometry, liquid secondary ion mass spectrometry, and as a highly lipophilic plasticizer in polymer membranes used in ion selective electrodes.

== See also ==
- Glycerol
- 3-Mercaptopropane-1,2-diol
- 3-Nitrobenzyl alcohol
- 18-Crown-6
- Sulfolane
- Diethanolamine
- Triethanolamine
