= Matrix-assisted ionization =

Scheme of inlet ionization

In mass spectrometry, matrix-assisted ionization (also inlet ionization) is a low fragmentation (soft) ionization technique which involves the transfer of particles of the analyte and matrix sample from atmospheric pressure (AP) to the heated inlet tube connecting the AP region to the vacuum of the mass analyzer.

Initial ionization occurs as the pressure drops within the inlet tube.

Inlet ionization is similar to electrospray ionization in that a reverse phase solvent system is used and the ions produced are highly charged, however a voltage or a laser is not always needed. It is a highly sensitive process for small and large molecules like peptides, proteins and lipids that can be coupled to a liquid chromatograph.

Inlet ionization techniques can be used with an Orbitrap mass analyzer, Orbitrap fourier transform mass spectrometer, linear trap quadrupole and MALDI-TOF.

== Types of inlet ionization ==
=== Matrix-assisted inlet ionization ===
Schematic of matrix-assisted inlet ionization (MAII)

In Matrix-assisted inlet ionization (MAII), a matrix which can be a solvent is used at ambient temperature with the analyte of interest as a mixture. The matrix/analyte mixture is inserted into the heated inlet tube through tapping the mixture at the opening end of the tube. For the highly charged ions of the analyte to be produced from ionization, desolvation of the matrix molecules needs to occur. Matrices that can be used include: 2,5-dihydroxybenzoic acid, 2,5-dihydroxyacetophenone, 2-aminobenzyl alcohol, anthranilic acid, and 2-hydroxyacetophenone.

=== Laserspray inlet ionization ===
Schematic of LSII

Laserspray inlet ionization (LSII) is a subset of MAII and uses a matrix-assisted laser desorption/ionization (MALDI) method. It was originally called atmospheric pressure matrix-assisted laser desorption/ionization however was renamed as LSII to avoid confusion with MALDI and as it was found to be a type of inlet ionization. As all inlet ionization techniques, highly multiply charged ions are produced. A nitrogen laser is used to ablate the solid matrix/analyte into the heated inlet tube, the observed ions are generated at the surface of the matrix/analyte and so the laser is not directly involved in the ionization as was originally thought. LSII can determine protein molecular weights and has been found to detect masses of proteins up to 20,000 Da. The sensitivity of LSII, for protein detection, is higher by an order of magnitude compared to ESI.

=== Solvent assisted inlet ionization ===
Schematic of SAII

Solvent assisted inlet ionization (SAII) is similar to matrix-assisted inlet ionization however the matrix is a solvent such as water, acetonitrile and methanol. This ionization technique is highly sensitive to small molecules, peptides and proteins. The analyte is dissolved in the solvent and can either be introduced to the heated inlet tube by a capillary column or directly injected into the inlet tube with a syringe or by pipetting. The capillary column is made of fused silica particles with one end submerged in the sample solvent and the other in the end of the heated inlet tube. The solvent flows through the capillary column without the use of a pump due to the pressure difference between ambient pressure and the vacuum.

The temperature can vary in the inlet tube from 50 °C to 450 °C, with the lower temperature being used if the results obtained from a higher temperature are of good resolution. Solvent assisted inlet ionization can be coupled not only to liquid chromatography (LC) but also to nano LC.

== Advantages of inlet ionization ==
Ionization at atmospheric pressure often leads to a loss of ions during the transfer of the ions from the ambient pressure region to the vacuum of the mass analyzer. Ions are lost due to dispersion of analyte spray and 'rim loss' causing fewer ions to reach the vacuum for m/z separation to occur. Initial ionization occurs in the sub-atmospheric pressure region of the heated inlet tube which is directly attached to the vacuum of the mass analyzer and so ion loss is reduced as transfer of the ions does not occur.

In LSII the use of the laser increases the image quality of the results by producing better spatial resolution. This is where more pixels are created and so a clearer image is obtained.

Multiply charged ions are produced further extending mass range.

Multiple methods can be used to fragment molecules producing fragmentation for structural information: electron transfer dissociation (ETD), collision-induced dissociation (CID), and electron capture dissociation (ECD).

When using a laser, only small volumes are needed.
