= Nanospray desorption electrospray ionization =

Technique used in mass spectrometry

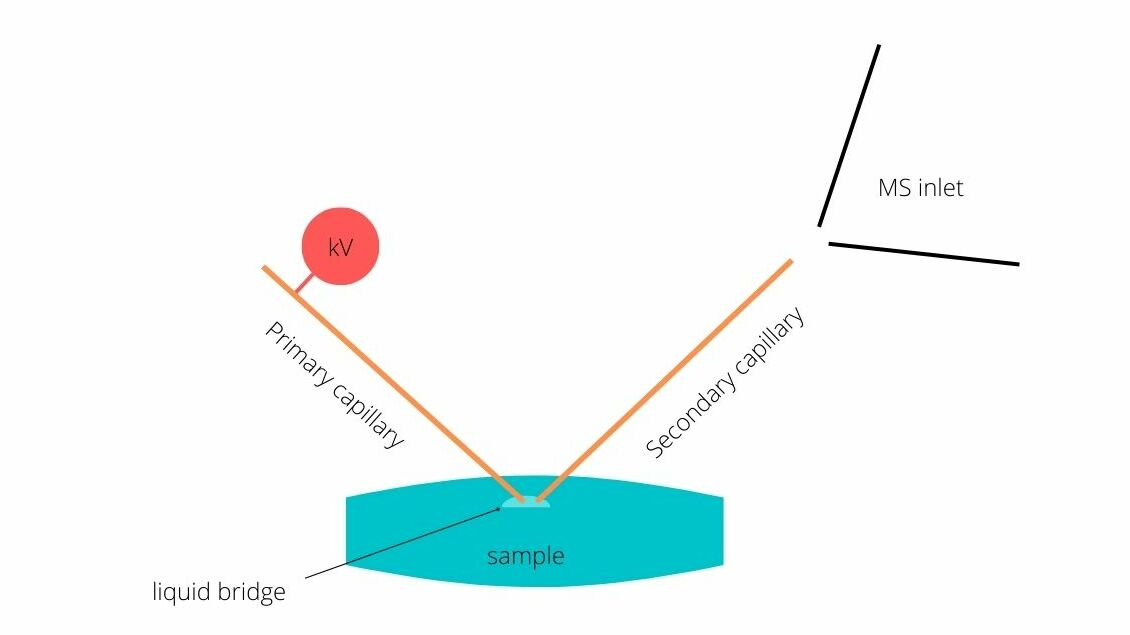
Typical setup of a nanospray desorption electrospray ionization probe.

Nanospray desorption electrospray ionization (nano-DESI) is an ambient pressure ionization technique used in mass spectrometry (MS) for chemical analysis of organic molecules. In this technique, analytes are desorbed into a liquid bridge formed between two capillaries and the sampling surface. Unlike desorption electrospray ionization (DESI), from which nano-DESI is derived, nano-DESI makes use of a secondary capillary, which improves the sampling efficiency.

== Principle of operation ==
The typical nano-DESI probe setup consists of two fused silica capillaries – primary capillary, which supplies solvent and maintains a liquid bridge, and secondary capillary, which transports the dissolved analyte to the mass spectrometer. High voltage (several kV) is applied between the inlet of the mass spectrometer and the primary capillary, creating a self-aspirating nanospray. The liquid bridge is maintained by continuous flow of the solvent and the contact area between the solvent bridge and sample surface can be controlled by changing the solvent flow rate, varying the diameter of the utilized capillaries and regulating the distance between the sample and the nano-DESI probe. In this way, the spatial resolution in mass spectrometry imaging applications can be improved, with typical resolution ranging between 100–150 μm.

== Pneumatically-assisted nano-DESI ==
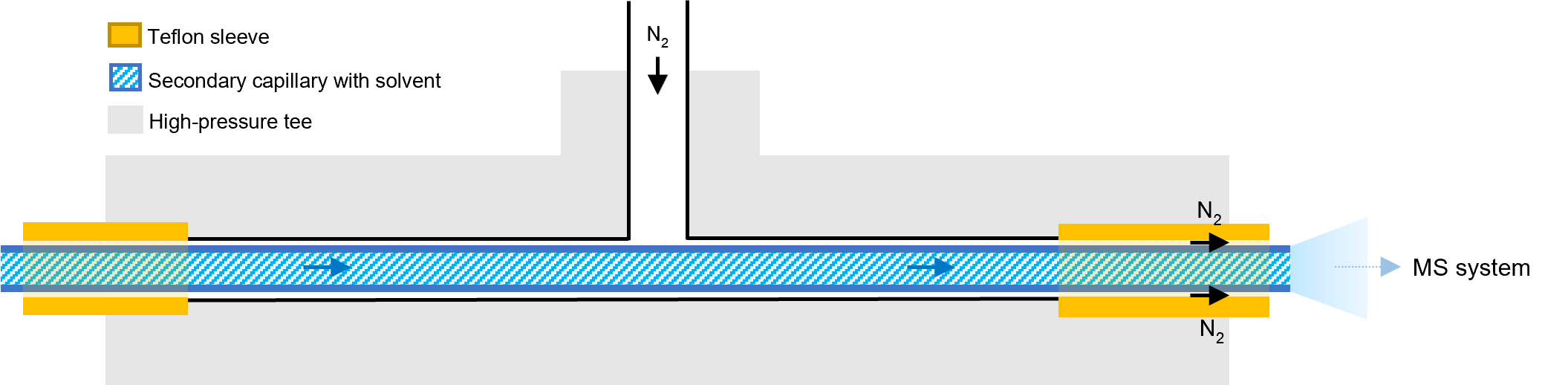
Schematic illustration of the pneumatically-assisted nano-DESI secondary capillary. The nebuliser device consists of a high-pressure tee connecting to the nitrogen supply, and a secondary capillary fitted with a Teflon sleeve at both ends.

To enhance sensitivity, the secondary capillary of the nano-DESI probe can be equipped with a nebulizer, which takes benefit of the Venturi effect, facilitating the aspiration of the liquid. This enables the secondary probe to be longer, while still maintaining stable electrospray, thereby simplifying the setup process. Moreover, it offers greater versatility in nano-DESI solvent selection, allowing water to be used as an extraction solvent. This expands the technique’s chemical coverage and enhances the customization of solvent components for selective extraction of polar compounds. Additionally, the capillaries can be integrated into a custom 3D-printed cassette, creating a convenient plug-and-play device.

== Applications ==
=== Mass spectrometry imaging ===
By continuously scanning a surface, such as tissue section, nano-DESI can be used for imaging. By carefully choosing the experimental conditions, such as the nano-DESI solvent, additives, and the ionization mode (positive or negative) we can map the distribution of a wide variety of complex molecules on different surfaces. A few examples to mention are proteins, lipids, small metabolites, drugs or even the distribution of endogenous alkali metals. Nano-DESI has been applied for localized analysis of complex molecules and imaging of tissue sections, microbial communities and environmental samples.

=== Single-cell analysis ===
By decreasing the inner diameter of the primary and secondary capillaries, spatial resolution can be decreased to 20x20 μm or even smaller facilitating the analysis of individual cells. This way even various proteoforms can be measured in single cells as well as global and spatial metabolomics.
