= 3-Hydroxypicolinic acid =

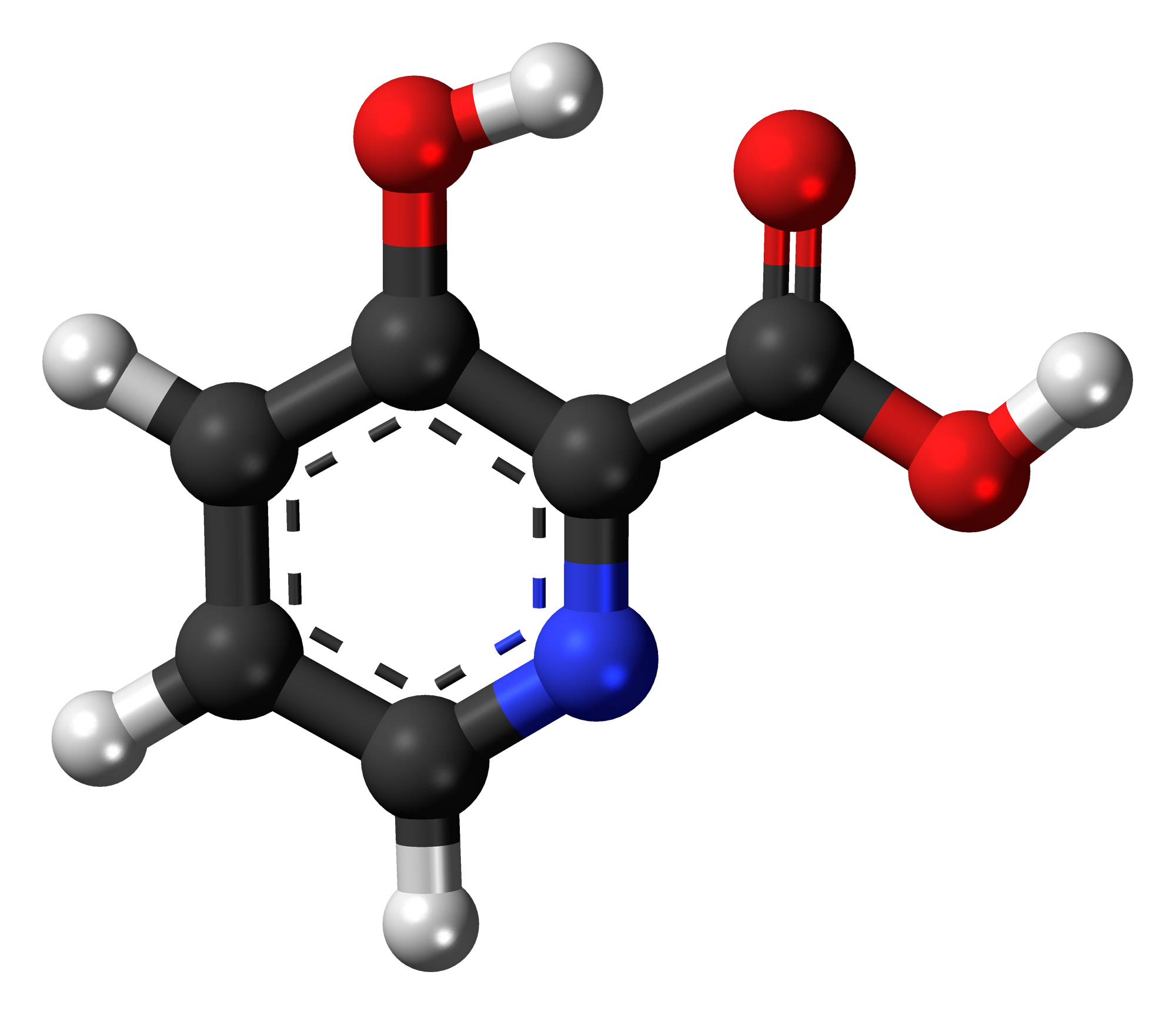

Names
- Preferred IUPAC name 3-Hydroxypyridine-2-carboxylic acid
- Other names 3-Hydroxypicolinic acid 3-Hydroxy-2-pyridinecarboxylic acid

Identifiers
CAS Number	874-24-8
3D model (JSmol)	Interactive image; Interactive image
ChEBI	CHEBI:63432
ChemSpider	12827
ECHA InfoCard	100.011.690
PubChem CID	13401
UNII	XV7XP64JR5
CompTox Dashboard (EPA)	DTXSID80236320
- InChI: InChI=1S/C6H5NO3/c8-4-2-1-3-7-5(4)6(9)10/h1-3,8H,(H,9,10) Key: BRARRAHGNDUELT-UHFFFAOYSA-N; InChI=1/C6H5NO3/c8-4-2-1-3-7-5(4)6(9)10/h1-3,8H,(H,9,10) Key: BRARRAHGNDUELT-UHFFFAOYAC
- SMILES: C1=CC(=C(N=C1)C(=O)O)O; c1cc(c(nc1)C(=O)O)O

Properties
Chemical formula	C_{6}H_{5}NO_{3}
Molar mass	139.109
Appearance	Light yellow needles
Melting point	208 to 212 °C (406 to 414 °F; 481 to 485 K)
- Except where otherwise noted, data are given for materials in their standard state (at 25 °C [77 °F], 100 kPa). verify (what is ?) Infobox references

3-Hydroxy picolinic acid is a picolinic acid derivative and is a member of the pyridine family. It is used as a matrix for nucleotides in MALDI mass spectrometry analyses and the synthesis of favipiravir.

== See also ==
- Sinapinic acid
- Picolinic acid
- α-Cyano-4-hydroxycinnamic acid
