= 3-Nitrobenzyl alcohol =

Names
- Preferred IUPAC name (3-Nitrophenyl)methanol
- Other names m-Nitrobenzyl alcohol Benzyl alcohol, m-nitro 3-Nitrobenzyl alcohol Benzenemethanol, 3-nitro- 3-Nitrobenzenemethanol

Identifiers
CAS Number	619-25-0
3D model (JSmol)	Interactive image; Interactive image
ChemSpider	62479
ECHA InfoCard	100.009.627
PubChem CID	69267
UNII	F829X990IV
CompTox Dashboard (EPA)	DTXSID0060698
- InChI: InChI=1S/C7H7NO3/c9-5-6-2-1-3-7(4-6)8(10)11/h1-4,9H,5H2 Key: CWNPOQFCIIFQDM-UHFFFAOYSA-N; InChI=1/C7H7NO3/c9-5-6-2-1-3-7(4-6)8(10)11/h1-4,9H,5H2 Key: CWNPOQFCIIFQDM-UHFFFAOYAE
- SMILES: C1=CC(=CC(=C1)[N+](=O)[O-])CO; [O-][N+](=O)c1cccc(c1)CO

Properties
Chemical formula	C_{7}H_{7}NO_{3}
Molar mass	153.135
Density	1.29 g/mL
Melting point	30 to 32 °C (86 to 90 °F; 303 to 305 K)
Boiling point	175 to 180 °C (347 to 356 °F; 448 to 453 K) (3 mmHg)
- Except where otherwise noted, data are given for materials in their standard state (at 25 °C [77 °F], 100 kPa). verify (what is ?) Infobox references

The compound 3-nitrobenzyl alcohol is an organic compound with the formula C_{7}H_{7}NO_{3}.

== Desorption mass spectrometry matrix ==
In mass spectrometry this compound is often abbreviated as "3-NBA" or "m-NBA." It has been used as a liquid matrix for fast atom bombardment and matrix-assisted laser desorption ionization. In electrospray ionization 3-NBA is doped into low surface tension spray solvents to increase analyte charging.
