= 3-Mercaptopropane-1,2-diol =

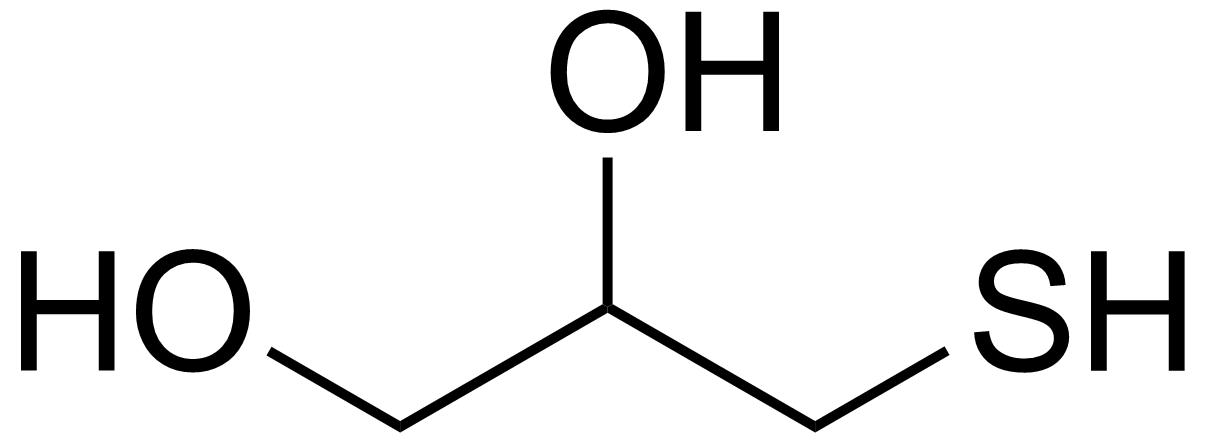
- Skeletal formula

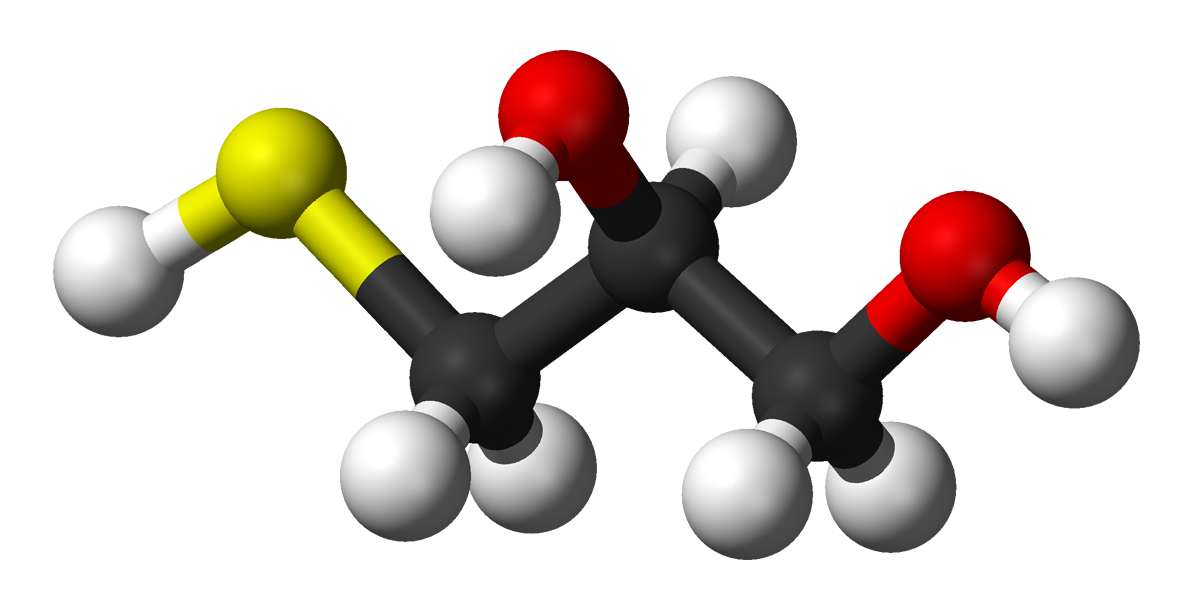
- Ball-and-stick model

Names
- Preferred IUPAC name 3-Sulfanylpropane-1,2-diol
- Other names Thioglycerol; Monothioglycerol; Thioglycerin; Thiovanol; 1-Thioglycerol; Monothioglycerin; Glycerol-1-thiol alpha-Thiolglycerol; 3-Mercapto-1,2-propanediole

Identifiers
| CAS Number | 96-27-5 |
| 3D model (JSmol) | Interactive image |
| ChEBI | CHEBI:74537 |
| ChemSpider | 7019 |
| ECHA InfoCard | 100.002.269 |
| KEGG | D05075 |
| PubChem CID | 7291 |
| UNII | AAO1P0WSXJ |
| CompTox Dashboard (EPA) | DTXSID5046512 |
- InChI: InChI=1S/C3H8O2S/c4-1-3(5)2-6/h3-6H,1-2H2 Key: PJUIMOJAAPLTRJ-UHFFFAOYSA-N; InChI=1/C3H8O2S/c4-1-3(5)2-6/h3-6H,1-2H2 Key: PJUIMOJAAPLTRJ-UHFFFAOYAH
- SMILES: OCC(O)CS

Properties
| Chemical formula | C_{3}H_{8}O_{2}S |
| Molar mass | 108.16 g·mol^{−1} |
| Density | 1.25 g/mL |
- Except where otherwise noted, data are given for materials in their standard state (at 25 °C [77 °F], 100 kPa). verify (what is ?) Infobox references

3-Mercaptopropane-1,2-diol, also known as thioglycerol, is a chemical compound and thiol that is used as a matrix in fast atom bombardment mass spectrometry and liquid secondary ion mass spectrometry.

== See also ==
- Glycerol
- Mercaptoethanol
