= Matrix-assisted laser desorption/ionization =

Ionization technique

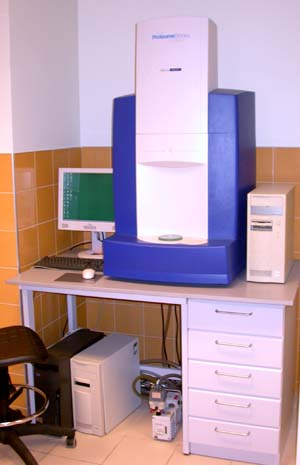
MALDI TOF mass spectrometer

In mass spectrometry, matrix-assisted laser desorption/ionization (MALDI) is an ionization technique that uses a laser energy-absorbing matrix to create ions from large molecules with minimal fragmentation. It has been applied to the analysis of biomolecules (biopolymers such as DNA, proteins, peptides and carbohydrates) and various organic molecules (such as polymers, dendrimers and other macromolecules), which tend to be fragile and fragment when ionized by more conventional ionization methods. It is similar in character to electrospray ionization (ESI) in that both techniques are relatively soft (low fragmentation) ways of obtaining ions of large molecules in the gas phase, though MALDI typically produces far fewer multi-charged ions.

MALDI methodology is a three-step process. First, the sample is mixed with a suitable matrix material and applied to a metal plate. Second, a pulsed laser irradiates the sample, triggering ablation and desorption of the sample and matrix material. Finally, the analyte molecules are ionized by being protonated or deprotonated in the hot plume of ablated gases, and then they can be accelerated into whichever mass spectrometer is used to analyse them.

== History ==
The term matrix-assisted laser desorption ionization (MALDI) was coined in 1985 by Franz Hillenkamp, Michael Karas and their colleagues. These researchers found that the amino acid alanine could be ionized more easily if it was mixed with the amino acid tryptophan and irradiated with a pulsed 266 nm laser. The tryptophan was absorbing the laser energy and helping to ionize the non-absorbing alanine. Peptides up to the 2843 Da peptide melittin could be ionized when mixed with this kind of "matrix". The breakthrough for large molecule laser desorption ionization came in 1987 when Koichi Tanaka of Shimadzu Corporation and his co-workers used what they called the "ultra fine metal plus liquid matrix method" that combined 30 nm cobalt particles in glycerol with a 337 nm nitrogen laser for ionization. Using this laser and matrix combination, Tanaka was able to ionize biomolecules as large as the 34,472 Da protein carboxypeptidase-A. Tanaka received one-quarter of the 2002 Nobel Prize in Chemistry for demonstrating that, with the proper combination of laser wavelength and matrix, a protein can be ionized. Karas and Hillenkamp were subsequently able to ionize the 67 kDa protein albumin using a nicotinic acid matrix and a 266 nm laser. Further improvements were realized through the use of a 355 nm laser and the cinnamic acid derivatives ferulic acid, caffeic acid and sinapinic acid as the matrix. The availability of small and relatively inexpensive nitrogen lasers operating at 337 nm wavelength and the first commercial instruments introduced in the early 1990s brought MALDI to an increasing number of researchers. Today, mostly organic matrices are used for MALDI mass spectrometry.

== Matrix ==
UV MALDI matrix list
Compound	Other names	Solvent	Wavelength (nm)	Applications
2,5-dihydroxy benzoic acid (gentisic acid)	DHB, gentisic acid	acetonitrile, water, methanol, acetone, chloroform	337, 355, 266	peptides, nucleotides, oligonucleotides, oligosaccharides
3,5-dimethoxy-4-hydroxycinnamic acid	sinapic acid; sinapinic acid; SA	acetonitrile, water, acetone, chloroform	337, 355, 266	peptides, proteins, lipids
4-hydroxy-3-methoxycinnamic acid	ferulic acid	acetonitrile, water, propanol	337, 355, 266	proteins
α-cyano-4-hydroxycinnamic acid	CHCA	acetonitrile, water, ethanol, acetone	337, 355	peptides, lipids, nucleotides
Picolinic acid	PA	Ethanol	266	oligonucleotides
3-hydroxy picolinic acid	HPA	Ethanol	337, 355	oligonucleotides

The matrix consists of crystallized molecules, of which the three most commonly used are sinapinic acid, α-cyano-4-hydroxycinnamic acid (α-CHCA, alpha-cyano or alpha-matrix) and 2,5-dihydroxybenzoic acid (DHB). A solution of one of these molecules is made, often in a mixture of highly purified water and an organic solvent such as acetonitrile (ACN) or ethanol. A counter ion source such as trifluoroacetic acid (TFA) is usually added to generate the [M+H] ions. A good example of a matrix-solution would be 20 mg/mL sinapinic acid in ACN:water:TFA (50:50:0.1).

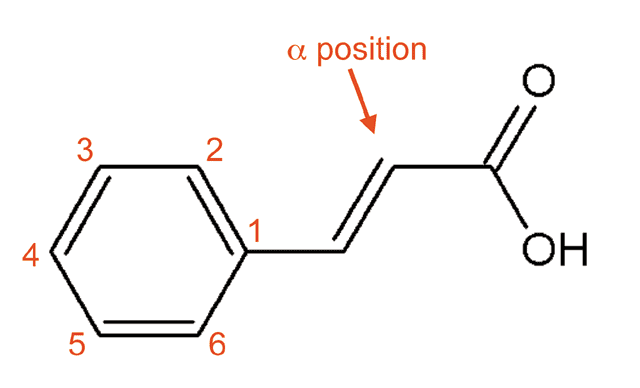
Notation for cinnamic acid substitutions

The identification of suitable matrix compounds is determined to some extent by trial and error, but they are based on some specific molecular design considerations. They are of a fairly low molecular weight (to allow easy vaporization), but are large enough (with a low enough vapor pressure) not to evaporate during sample preparation or while standing in the mass spectrometer. They are often acidic, therefore act as a proton source to encourage ionization of the analyte. Basic matrices have also been reported. They have a strong optical absorption in either the UV or IR range, so that they rapidly and efficiently absorb the laser irradiation. This efficiency is commonly associated with chemical structures incorporating several conjugated double bonds, as seen in the structure of cinnamic acid. They are functionalized with polar groups, allowing their use in aqueous solutions. They typically contain a chromophore.

The matrix solution is mixed with the analyte (e.g. protein-sample). A mixture of water and organic solvent allows both hydrophobic and water-soluble (hydrophilic) molecules to dissolve into the solution. This solution is spotted onto a MALDI plate (usually a metal plate designed for this purpose). The solvents vaporize, leaving only the recrystallized matrix, but now with analyte molecules embedded into MALDI crystals. The matrix and the analyte are said to be co-crystallized. Co-crystallization is a key issue in selecting a proper matrix to obtain a good quality mass spectrum of the analyte of interest.

In analysis of biological systems, inorganic salts, which are also part of protein extracts, interfere with the ionization process. The salts can be removed by solid phase extraction or by washing the dried-droplet MALDI spots with cold water. Both methods can also remove other substances from the sample. The matrix-protein mixture is not homogeneous because the polarity difference leads to a separation of the two substances during co-crystallization. The spot diameter of the target is much larger than that of the laser, which makes it necessary to make many laser shots at different places of the target, to get the statistical average of the substance concentration within the target spot.

Naphthalene and naphthalene-like compounds can also be used as a matrix to ionize a sample.

The matrix can be used to tune the instrument to ionize the sample in different ways. As mentioned above, acid-base like reactions are often utilized to ionize the sample, however, molecules with conjugated pi systems, such as naphthalene like compounds, can also serve as an electron acceptor and thus a matrix for MALDI/TOF. This is particularly useful in studying molecules that also possess conjugated pi systems. The most widely used application for these matrices is studying porphyrin-like compounds such as chlorophyll. These matrices have been shown to have better ionization patterns that do not result in odd fragmentation patterns or complete loss of side chains. It has also been suggested that conjugated porphyrin like molecules can serve as a matrix and cleave themselves eliminating the need for a separate matrix compound.

== Instrumentation ==
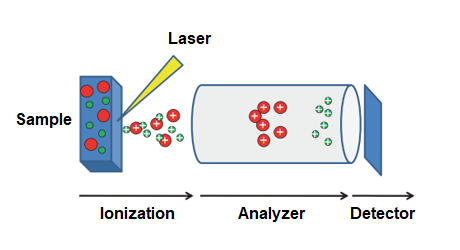
Diagram of a MALDI TOF instrument. Sample matrix ionized by radiant energy is ejected from surface. Sample travels into mass analyzer and is substantially detected.

There are several variations of the MALDI technology and comparable instruments are today produced for very different purposes, from more academic and analytical, to more industrial and high throughput. The mass spectrometry field has expanded into requiring ultrahigh resolution mass spectrometry such as the FT-ICR instruments as well as more high-throughput instruments. As many MALDI MS instruments can be bought with an interchangeable ionization source (electrospray ionization, MALDI, atmospheric pressure ionization, etc.) the technologies often overlap and many times any soft ionization method could potentially be used. For more variations of soft ionization methods see: Soft laser desorption or Ion source.

=== Laser ===
MALDI techniques typically employ the use of UV lasers such as nitrogen lasers (337 nm) and frequency-tripled and quadrupled Nd:YAG lasers (355 nm and 266 nm respectively).

Infrared laser wavelengths used for infrared MALDI include the 2.94 μm Er:YAG laser, mid-IR optical parametric oscillator, and 10.6 μm carbon dioxide laser. Although not as common, infrared lasers are used due to their softer mode of ionization. IR-MALDI also has the advantage of greater material removal (useful for biological samples), less low-mass interference, and compatibility with other matrix-free laser desorption mass spectrometry methods.

=== Time of flight ===
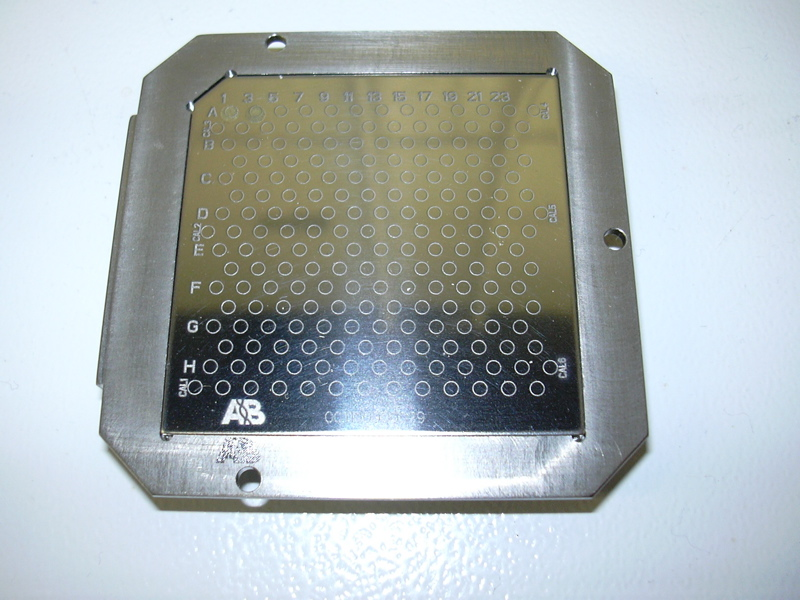
Sample target for a MALDI mass spectrometer

The type of a mass spectrometer most widely used with MALDI is the time-of-flight mass spectrometer (TOF), mainly due to its large mass range. The TOF measurement procedure is also ideally suited to the MALDI ionization process since the pulsed laser takes individual 'shots' rather than working in continuous operation. MALDI-TOF instruments are often equipped with a reflectron (an "ion mirror") that reflects ions using an electric field. This increases the ion flight path, thereby increasing time of flight between ions of different m/z and increasing resolution. Modern commercial reflectron TOF instruments reach a resolving power m/Δm of 50,000 FWHM (full-width half-maximum, Δm defined as the peak width at 50% of peak height) or more.

MALDI has been coupled with IMS-TOF MS to identify phosphorylated and non-phosphorylated peptides.

MALDI-FT-ICR MS has been demonstrated to be a useful technique where high resolution MALDI-MS measurements are desired.

=== Atmospheric pressure ===
Atmospheric pressure (AP) matrix-assisted laser desorption/ionization (MALDI) is an ionization technique (ion source) that in contrast to vacuum MALDI operates at normal atmospheric environment. The main difference between vacuum MALDI and AP-MALDI is the pressure in which the ions are created. In vacuum MALDI, ions are typically produced at 10 mTorr or less while in AP-MALDI ions are formed in atmospheric pressure. In the past, the main disadvantage of the AP-MALDI technique compared to the conventional vacuum MALDI has been its limited sensitivity; however, ions can be transferred into the mass spectrometer with high efficiency and attomole detection limits have been reported. AP-MALDI is used in mass spectrometry (MS) in a variety of applications ranging from proteomics to drug discovery. Popular topics that are addressed by AP-MALDI mass spectrometry include: proteomics; mass analysis of DNA, RNA, PNA, lipids, oligosaccharides, phosphopeptides, bacteria, small molecules and synthetic polymers, similar applications as available also for vacuum MALDI instruments. The AP-MALDI ion source is easily coupled to an ion trap mass spectrometer or any other MS system equipped with electrospray ionization (ESI) or nanoESI source.

MALDI with ionization at reduced pressure is known to produce mainly singly-charged ions (see "Ionization mechanism" below). In contrast, ionization at atmospheric pressure can generate highly-charged analytes as was first shown for infrared and later also for nitrogen lasers. Multiple charging of analytes is of great importance, because it allows to measure high-molecular-weight compounds like proteins in instruments, which provide only smaller m/z detection ranges such as quadrupoles. Besides the pressure, the composition of the matrix is important to achieve this effect.

=== Aerosol ===
In aerosol mass spectrometry, one of the ionization techniques consists in firing a laser to individual droplets. These systems are called single particle mass spectrometers (SPMS). The sample may optionally be mixed with a MALDI matrix prior to aerosolization.

== Ionization mechanism ==
The laser is fired at the matrix crystals in the dried-droplet spot. The matrix absorbs the laser energy and it is thought that primarily the matrix is desorbed and ionized (by addition of a proton) by this event. The hot plume produced during ablation contains many species: neutral and ionized matrix molecules, protonated and deprotonated matrix molecules, matrix clusters and nanodroplets. Ablated species may participate in the ionization of analyte, though the mechanism of MALDI is still debated. The matrix is then thought to transfer protons to the analyte molecules (e.g., protein molecules), thus charging the analyte. An ion observed after this process will consist of the initial neutral molecule [M] with ions added or removed. This is called a quasimolecular ion, for example [M+H]^{+} in the case of an added proton, [M+Na]^{+} in the case of an added sodium ion, or [M-H]^{−} in the case of a removed proton. MALDI is capable of creating singly charged ions or multiply charged ions ([M+nH]^{n+}) depending on the nature of the matrix, the laser intensity, and/or the voltage used. Note that these are all even-electron species. Ion signals of radical cations (photoionized molecules) can be observed, e.g., in the case of matrix molecules and other organic molecules.

The gas phase proton transfer model, implemented as the coupled physical and chemical dynamics (CPCD) model, of UV laser MALDI postulates primary and secondary processes leading to ionization. Primary processes involve initial charge separation through absorption of photons by the matrix and pooling of the energy to form matrix ion pairs. Primary ion formation occurs through absorption of a UV photon to create excited state molecules by

S_{0} + hν → S_{1}

S_{1} + S_{1} → S_{0} + S_{n}

S_{1} + S_{n} → M^{+} + M^{−}

where S_{0} is the ground electronic state, S_{1} the first electronic excited state, and S_{n} is a higher electronic excited state. The product ions can be proton transfer or electron transfer ion pairs, indicated by M^{+} and M^{−} above. Secondary processes involve ion-molecule reactions to form analyte ions.

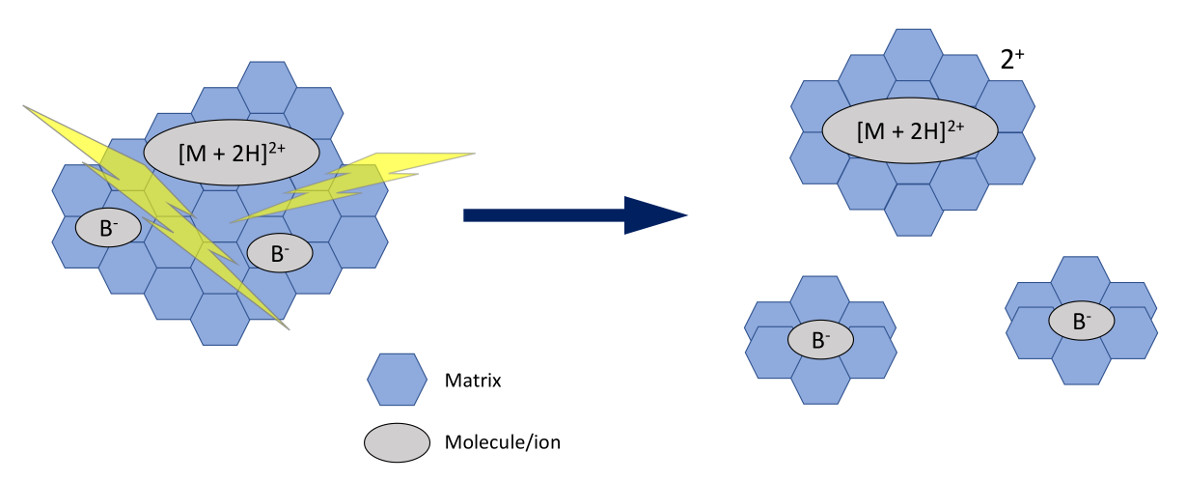
In the lucky survivor model, positive ions can be formed from highly charged clusters produced during break-up of the matrix- and analyte-containing solid.

The lucky survivor model (cluster ionization mechanism) postulates that analyte molecules are incorporated in the matrix maintaining the charge state from solution. Ion formation occurs through charge separation upon fragmentation of laser ablated clusters. Ions that are not neutralized by recombination with photoelectrons or counter ions are the so-called lucky survivors.

The thermal model postulates that the high temperature facilitates the proton transfer between matrix and analyte in melted matrix liquid. Ion-to-neutral ratio is an important parameter to justify the theoretical model, and the mistaken citation of ion-to-neutral ratio could result in an erroneous determination of the ionization mechanism. The model quantitatively predicts the increase in total ion intensity as a function of the concentration and proton affinity of the analytes, and the ion-to-neutral ratio as a function of the laser fluences. This model also suggests that metal ion adducts (e.g., [M+Na]^{+} or [M+K]^{+}) are mainly generated from the thermally induced dissolution of salt.

The matrix-assisted ionization (MAI) method uses matrix preparation similar to MALDI but does not require laser ablation to produce analyte ions of volatile or nonvolatile compounds. Simply exposing the matrix with analyte to the vacuum of the mass spectrometer creates ions with nearly identical charge states to electrospray ionization. It is suggested that there are likely mechanistic commonality between this process and MALDI.

Ion yield is typically estimated to range from 10^{−4} to 10^{−7}, with some experiments hinting to even lower yields of 10^{−9}. The issue of low ion yields had been addressed, already shortly after introduction of MALDI by various attempts, including post-ionization utilizing a second laser. Most of these attempts showed only limited success, with low signal increases. This might be attributed to the fact that axial time-of-flight instruments were used, which operate at pressures in the source region of 10^{−5} to 10^{−6}, which results in rapid plume expansion with particle velocities of up to 1000 m/s. In 2015, successful laser post-ionization was reported, using a modified MALDI source operated at an elevated pressure of ~3 mbar coupled to an orthogonal time-of-flight mass analyzer, and employing a wavelength-tunable post-ionization laser, operated at wavelength from 260 nm to 280 nm, below the two-photon ionization threshold of the matrices used, which elevated ion yields of several lipids and small molecules by up to three orders of magnitude. This approach, called MALDI-2, due to the second laser, and the second MALDI-like ionization process, was afterwards adopted for other mass spectrometers, all equipped with sources operating in the low mbar range.

== Applications ==
=== Biochemistry ===
In proteomics, MALDI is used for the rapid identification of proteins isolated by using gel electrophoresis: SDS-PAGE, size exclusion chromatography, affinity chromatography, strong/weak ion exchange, isotope coded protein labeling (ICPL), and two-dimensional gel electrophoresis. Peptide mass fingerprinting is the most popular analytical application of MALDI-TOF mass spectrometers. MALDI TOF/TOF mass spectrometers are used to reveal amino acid sequence of peptides using post-source decay or high energy collision-induced dissociation (further use see mass spectrometry).

MALDI-TOF have been used to characterise post-translational modifications. For example, it has been widely applied to study protein methylation and demethylation. However, care must be taken when studying post-translational modifications by MALDI-TOF. For example, it has been reported that loss of sialic acid has been identified in papers when dihydroxybenzoic acid (DHB) has been used as a matrix for MALDI MS analysis of glycosylated peptides. Using sinapinic acid, 4-HCCA and DHB as matrices, S. Martin studied loss of sialic acid in glycosylated peptides by metastable decay in MALDI/TOF in linear mode and reflector mode. A group at Shimadzu Corporation derivatized the sialic acid by an amidation reaction as a way to improve detection sensitivity and also demonstrated that ionic liquid matrix reduces a loss of sialic acid during MALDI/TOF MS analysis of sialylated oligosaccharides. THAP, DHAP, and a mixture of 2-aza-2-thiothymine and phenylhydrazine have been identified as matrices that could be used to minimize loss of sialic acid during MALDI MS analysis of glycosylated peptides. It has been reported that a reduction in loss of some post-translational modifications can be accomplished if IR MALDI is used instead of UV MALDI.

Besides proteins, MALDI-TOF has also been applied to study lipids. For example, it has been applied to study the catalytic reactions of phospholipases. In addition to lipids, oligonucleotides have also been characterised by MALDI-TOF. For example, in molecular biology, a mixture of 5-methoxysalicylic acid and spermine can be used as a matrix for oligonucleotides analysis in MALDI mass spectrometry, for instance after oligonucleotide synthesis.

=== Organic chemistry ===
Some synthetic macromolecules, such as catenanes and rotaxanes, dendrimers and hyperbranched polymers, and other assemblies, have molecular weights extending into the thousands or tens of thousands, where most ionization techniques have difficulty producing molecular ions. MALDI is a simple and fast analytical method that can allow chemists to rapidly analyze the results of such syntheses and verify their results.

=== Polymers ===
In polymer chemistry, MALDI can be used to determine the molar mass distribution. Polymers with polydispersity greater than 1.2 are difficult to characterize with MALDI due to the signal intensity discrimination against higher mass oligomers.

A good matrix for polymers is dithranol or AgTFA. The sample must first be mixed with dithranol and the AgTFA added afterwards; otherwise the sample will precipitate out of solution.

=== Microbiology ===
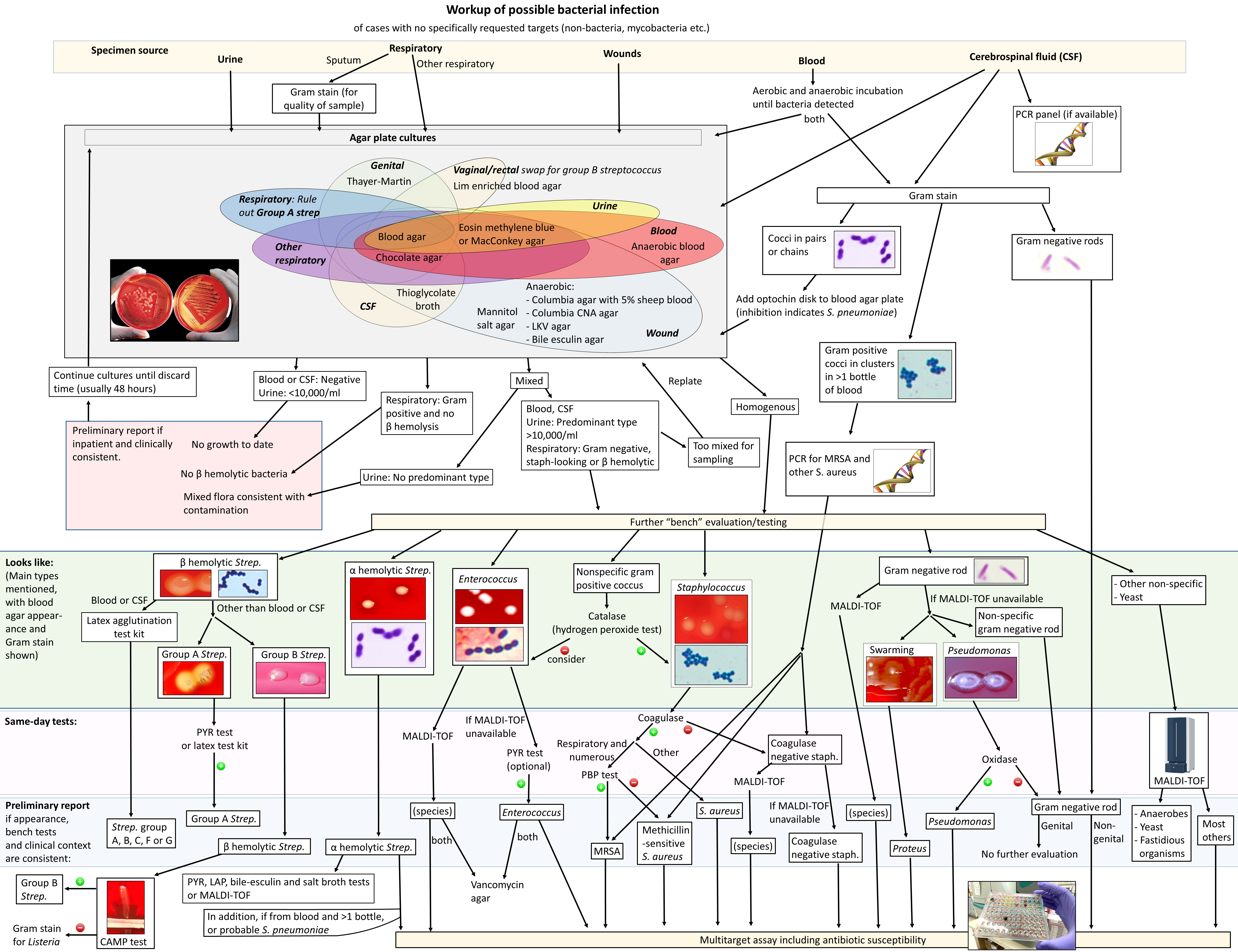
Example of a workup algorithm of possible bacterial infection in cases with no specifically requested targets (non-bacteria, mycobacteria etc.), with most common situations and agents seen in a New England community hospital setting. MALDI-TOF is seen in multiple situations in the "same day tests" row at center-bottom.

MALDI-TOF spectra are often used for the identification of microorganisms such as bacteria or fungi. A portion of a colony of the microbe in question is placed onto the sample target and overlaid with matrix. The mass spectra of expressed proteins generated are analyzed by dedicated software and compared with stored profiles for species determination in what is known as biotyping. It offers benefits to other immunological or biochemical procedures and has become a common method for species identification in clinical microbiological laboratories. Benefits of high resolution MALDI-MS performed on a Fourier transform ion cyclotron resonance mass spectrometry (also known as FT-MS) have been demonstrated for typing and subtyping viruses though single ion detection known as proteotyping, with a particular focus on influenza viruses.

One main advantage over other microbiological identification methods is its ability to rapidly and reliably identify, at low cost, a wide variety of microorganisms directly from the selective medium used to isolate them. The absence of the need to purify the suspect or "presumptive" colony allows for a much faster turn-around times. For example, it has been demonstrated that MALDI-TOF can be used to detect bacteria directly from blood cultures.

Another advantage is the potential to predict antibiotic susceptibility of bacteria. A single mass spectral peak can predict methicillin resistance of Staphylococcus aureus. MALDI can also detect carbapenemase of carbapenem-resistant enterobacteriaceae, including Acinetobacter baumannii and Klebsiella pneumoniae. However, most proteins that mediate antibiotic resistance are larger than MALDI-TOF's 2000–20,000 Da range for protein peak interpretation and only occasionally, as in the 2011 Klebsiella pneumoniae carbapenemase (KPC) outbreak at the NIH, a correlation between a peak and resistance conferring protein can be made.

=== Parasitology ===
MALDI-TOF spectra have been used for the detection and identification of various parasites such as trypanosomatids, Leishmania and Plasmodium. In addition to these unicellular parasites, MALDI/TOF can be used for the identification of parasitic insects such as lice or cercariae, the free-swimming stage of trematodes.

=== Medicine ===
MALDI-TOF spectra are often utilized in tandem with other analysis and spectroscopy techniques in the diagnosis of diseases. MALDI/TOF is a diagnostic tool with much potential because it allows for the rapid identification of proteins and changes to proteins without the cost or computing power of sequencing nor the skill or time needed to solve a crystal structure in X-ray crystallography.

One example of this is necrotizing enterocolitis (NEC), which is a devastating disease that affects the bowels of premature infants. The symptoms of NEC are very similar to those of sepsis, and many infants die awaiting diagnosis and treatment. MALDI/TOF was used to identify bacteria present in the fecal matter of NEC positive infants. This study focused on characterization of the fecal microbiota associated with NEC and did not address the mechanism of disease. There is hope that a similar technique could be used as a quick, diagnostic tool that would not require sequencing.

Another example of the diagnostic power of MALDI/TOF is in the area of cancer. Pancreatic cancer remains one of the most deadly and difficult to diagnose cancers. Impaired cellular signaling due to mutations in membrane proteins has been long suspected to contribute to pancreatic cancer. MALDI/TOF has been used to identify a membrane protein associated with pancreatic cancer and at one point may even serve as an early detection technique.

MALDI/TOF can also potentially be used to dictate treatment as well as diagnosis. MALDI/TOF serves as a method for determining the drug resistance of bacteria, especially to β-lactams (Penicillin family). The MALDI/TOF detects the presence of carbapenemases, which indicates drug resistance to standard antibiotics. It is predicted that this could serve as a method for identifying a bacterium as drug resistant in as little as three hours. This technique could help physicians decide whether to prescribe more aggressive antibiotics initially.

=== Detection of protein complexes ===
Following initial observations that some peptide-peptide complexes could survive MALDI deposition and ionization, studies of large protein complexes using MALDI-MS have been reported.

=== Small molecules ===
While MALDI is a common technique for large macro-molecules, it is often possible to also analyze small molecules with mass below 1000 Da. The problem with small molecules is that of matrix effects, where signal interference, detector saturation, or suppression of the analyte signal is possible since the matrices often consists of small molecules themselves. The choice of matrix is highly dependent on what molecules are to be analyzed.

=== MALDI-imaging mass spectrometry ===
Due to MALDI being a soft ionization source, it is used on a wide variety of biomolecules. This has led to it being used in new ways such as MALDI-imaging mass spectrometry. This technique allows for the imaging of the spatial distribution of biomolecules.

== See also ==
- MALDI imaging
- Matrix (mass spectrometry)
- PEGylation
- Peptide mass fingerprinting

== Bibliography ==
- Ragoussis, J.; Elvidge, G. P.; Kaur, K.; Colella, S. (2006). "Matrix-Assisted Laser Desorption/Ionisation, Time-of-Flight Mass Spectrometry in Genomics Research". PLOS Genetics. 2 (7) e100. doi:10.1371/journal.pgen.0020100. PMC 1523240. PMID 16895448.
- Hardouin, J. (2007). "Protein sequence information by matrix-assisted laser desorption/ionization in-source decay mass spectrometry". Mass Spectrometry Reviews. 26 (5): 672–82. Bibcode:2007MSRv...26..672H. doi:10.1002/mas.20142. PMID 17492750.
- Peter-Katalinic, J.; Hillenkamp, F. (2007). MALDI MS: A Practical Guide to Instrumentation, Methods and Applications. Wiley-VCH. ISBN 978-3-527-31440-9.
- Schrepp, W.; Pasch, H. (2003). MALDI-TOF Mass Spectrometry of Synthetic Polymers. Springer-Verlag. ISBN 978-3-540-44259-2.
