= Α-Cyano-4-hydroxycinnamic acid =

α-Cyano-4-hydroxycinnamic acid

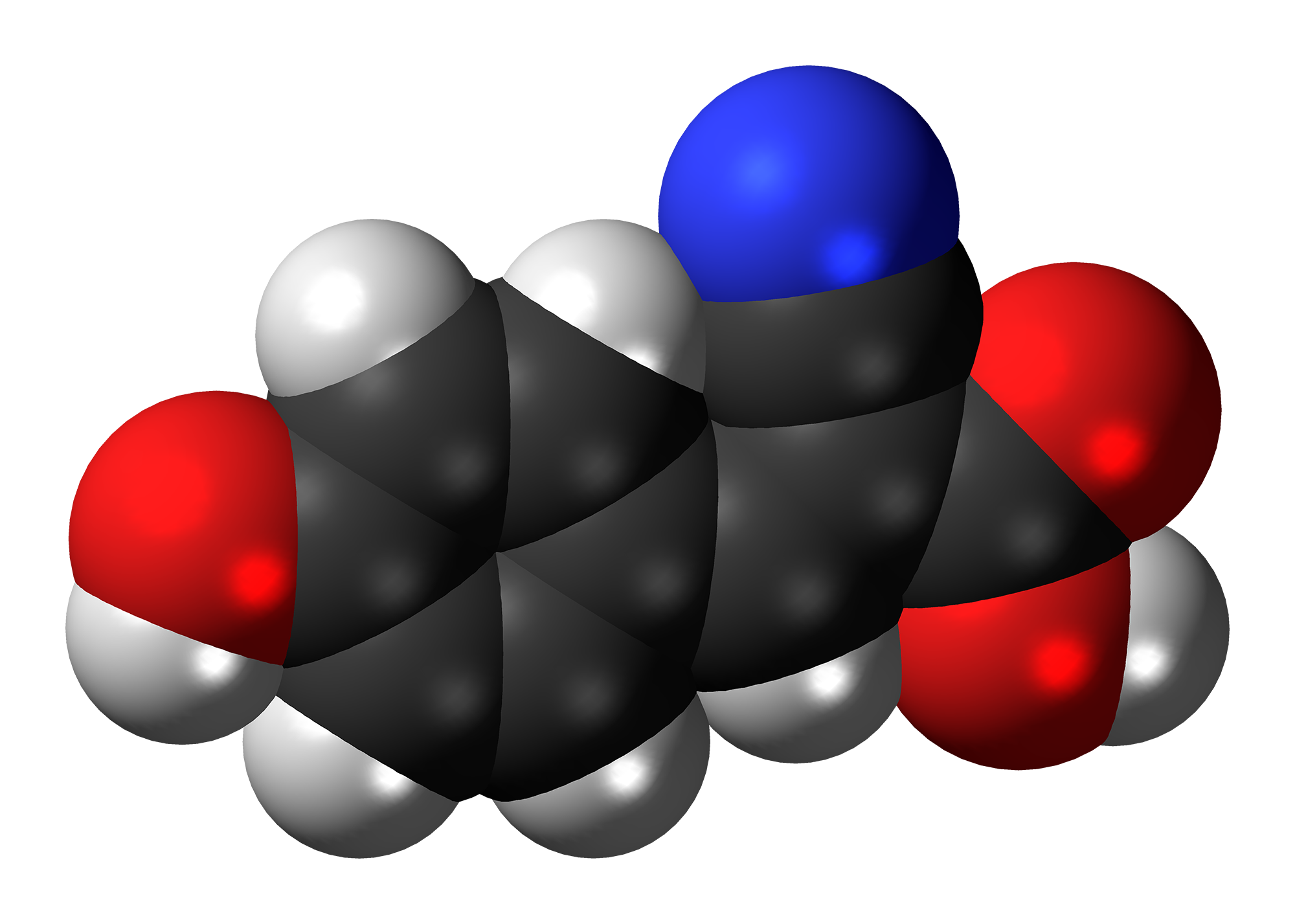

Names
- Preferred IUPAC name (2E)-2-Cyano-3-(4-hydroxyphenyl)prop-2-enoic acid
- Other names α-Cyano-p-hydroxycinnamic acid 2-Cyano-4-hydroxycinnamic acid 2-Cyano-3-(4-hydroxyphenyl)-2-propenoic acid 2-Cyano-3-(4-hydroxyphenyl)-2-acrylic acid 4-Hydroxy-α-cyanocinnamic acid

Identifiers
CAS Number	28166-41-8
3D model (JSmol)	Interactive image
ChEBI	CHEBI:64340
ChemSpider	4485953
ECHA InfoCard	100.044.421
PubChem CID	5328791
UNII	NL5EEM9E2G
- InChI: InChI=1S/C10H7NO3/c11-6-8(10(13)14)5-7-1-3-9(12)4-2-7/h1-5,12H,(H,13,14)/b8-5+ Key: AFVLVVWMAFSXCK-VMPITWQZSA-N; InChI=1/C10H7NO3/c11-6-8(10(13)14)5-7-1-3-9(12)4-2-7/h1-5,12H,(H,13,14)/b8-5+ Key: AFVLVVWMAFSXCK-VMPITWQZBB
- SMILES: c1cc(ccc1/C=C(\C#N)/C(=O)O)O

Properties
Chemical formula	C_{10}H_{7}NO_{3}
Molar mass	189.170 g·mol^{−1}
Appearance	Yellow powder
Melting point	245 to 250 °C (473 to 482 °F; 518 to 523 K)
- Except where otherwise noted, data are given for materials in their standard state (at 25 °C [77 °F], 100 kPa). verify (what is ?) Infobox references

α-Cyano-4-hydroxycinnamic acid, also written as alpha-cyano-4-hydroxycinnamic acid and abbreviated CHCA or HCCA, is a cinnamic acid derivative and is a member of the phenylpropanoid family. The carboxylate form is α-cyano-4-hydroxycinnamate.

== Matrix-assisted laser desorption/ionization ==
α-Cyano-4-hydroxycinnamic acid is used as a matrix for peptides and nucleotides in MALDI mass spectrometry analyses.

== See also ==
- Sinapinic acid
