= In-gel digestion =

The in-gel digestion step is a part of the sample preparation for the mass spectrometric identification of proteins in course of proteomic analysis. The method was introduced in 1992 by Rosenfeld. Innumerable modifications and improvements in the basic elements of the procedure remain.

The in-gel digestion step primarily comprises the four steps; destaining, reduction and alkylation (R&A) of the cysteines in the protein, proteolytic cleavage of the protein and extraction of the generated peptides.

== Destaining ==
Proteins which were separated by 1D or 2D PAGE are usually visualised by staining with dyes like Coomassie brilliant blue (CBB) or silver. Although the sensitivity of the method is significantly lower, the use of Coomassie is more common for samples destined for mass spectrometry since the silver staining impairs the analysis. After excision of the protein band of interest from the gel most protocols require a destaining of the proteins before proceeding.

The destaining solution for CBB contains usually the buffer salt ammonium bicarbonate (NH_{4}HCO_{3}) and a fraction of 30%-50% organic solvent (mostly acetonitrile). The hydrophobic interactions between protein and CBB are reduced by the organic fraction of the solution. At the same time, the ionic part of the solution diminishes the electrostatic bonds between the dye and the positively charged amino acids of the protein. In contrast to a mixture of water with organic solvent the effectivity of destaining is increased. An increase of temperature promotes the destaining process. To a certain degree (< 10%) the destaining procedure is accompanied with a loss of protein. Furthermore, the removal of CBB does not affect the yield of peptides in the mass spectrometric measurement.

In the case of silver stained protein bands the destaining is accomplished by oxidation of the metallic silver attached to the protein by potassium ferricyanide or hydrogen peroxide (H_{2}O_{2}). The released silver ions are complexed subsequently by sodium thiosulfate.

== Reduction and alkylation (R & A) ==
The staining and destaining of gels is often followed by the reduction and alkylation (r&a) of the cystines or cysteines in the proteins. Hereby, the disulfide bonds of the proteins are irreversibly broken up and the optimal unfolding of the tertiary structure is obtained. The reduction to the thiol is accomplished by the reaction with chemicals containing sulfhydryl or phosphine groups such as dithiothreitol (DTT) or tris-2-carboxyethylphosphine hydrochloride (TCEP). In course of the subsequent irreversible alkylation of the SH groups with iodoacetamide the cysteines are transformed to the stable S-carboxyamidomethylcysteine (CAM; adduct: -CH_{2}-CONH_{2}). The molecular weight of the cysteine amino-acid residue is thereby increased from 103.01 Da to 160.03 Da.

Reduction and alkylation of cysteine residues improves peptide yield and sequence coverage and the identification of proteins with a high number of disulfide bonds. Due to the rareness of the amino acid cysteine for most of the proteins the step of r&a does not effect any improvement of the mass spectrometric analysis. For the quantitative and homogeneous alkylation of cysteines the position of the modification step in the sample-preparation process is crucial. With denaturing electrophoresis it is strongly recommended to perform the reaction before the execution of the electrophoresis, since there are free acrylamide monomers in the gel able to modify cysteine residues irreversibly. The resulting acrylamide adducts have a molecular weight of 174.05 Da.

== In-gel digestion ==
Afterwards the eponymous step of the method is performed, the in-gel digestion of the proteins. By this procedure, the protein is cut enzymatically into a limited number of shorter fragments. These fragments are called peptides and allow for the identification of the protein with their characteristic mass and pattern. The serine protease trypsin is the most common enzyme used in protein analytics. Trypsin cuts the peptide bond specifically at the carboxyl end of the basic aminoacids arginine and lysine. If there is an acidic amino acid like aspartic acid or glutamic acid in direct neighborhood to the cutting site, the rate of hydrolysis is diminished, a proline C-terminal to the cutting site inhibits the hydrolysis completely.

An undesirable side effect of the use of proteolytic enzymes is the self digestion of the protease. To avoid this, in the past Ca^{2+}-ions were added to the digestion buffer. Nowadays most suppliers offer modified trypsin where selective methylation of the lysines limits the autolytic activity to the arginine cutting sites. Unmodified trypsin has its highest activity between 35 °C and 45 °C. After the modification, the optimal temperature is changed to the range of 50 °C to 55 °C. Other enzymes used for in-gel digestion are the endoproteases Lys-C, Glu-C, Asp-N and Lys-N. These proteases cut specifically at only one amino acid e.g. Asp-N cuts n-terminal of aspartic acid. Therefore, a lower number of longer peptides is obtained.

The analysis of the complete primary sequence of a protein using only one protease is usually not possible. In those cases the digestion of the target protein in several approaches with different enzymes is recommended. The resulting overlapping peptides permit the assembly of the complete sequence of the protein.

For the digestion the proteins fixed in the matrix of the gel have to be made accessible for the protease. The permeation of the enzyme to the gel is believed to be facilitated by the dehydration of the gel pieces by treatment with acetonitrile and subsequent swelling in the digestion buffer containing the protease. This procedure relies on the presumption that the protease permeates to the gel by the process of swelling. Different studies about the penetration of the enzymes to the gel showed the process to be almost completely driven by diffusion. The drying of the gel does not seem to support the process. Therefore, the improvement of the in-gel digestion has to be achieved by the reduction of the way of the enzyme to its substrate e.g. by cutting the gel to pieces as small as possible.

Usually, the in-gel digestion is run as an overnight process. For the use of trypsin as protease and a temperature of 37 °C the time of incubation found in most protocols is 12-15 h. However, experiments about the duration of the digestion process showed that after 3 h there is enough material for successful mass spectrometric analysis. Furthermore, the optimisation of the conditions for the protease in temperature and pH allows for the completion of the digestion of a sample in 30 min.

Surfactant (detergents) can aid in the solubilization and denaturing of proteins in the gel and thereby shorten digestion times and increase protein cleavage and the number and amount of extracted peptides, especially for lipophilic proteins such as membrane proteins. Cleavable detergents are detergents that are cleaved after digestion, often under acidic conditions. This makes the addition of detergents compatible with mass spectrometry.

== Extraction ==
After finishing the digestion the peptides generated in this process have to be extracted from the gel matrix. This is accomplished by one or several extraction steps. The gel particles are incubated with an extraction solution and the supernatant is collected. In the first extraction, almost all of the peptide is recovered, the repetition of the extraction step can increase the yield of the whole process by only 5-10%. To meet the requirements of peptides with different physical and chemical properties an iterative extraction with basic or acidic solutions is performed. For the extraction of acidic peptides a solution similar to the concentration and composition of the digestion buffer is used; basic peptides are extracted in dependence to the intended mass spectrometric method with a low concentrated acidic solution of formic acid for ESI and trifluoroacetic acid for MALDI respectively. Studies on model proteins showed a recovery of approximately 70–80% of the expected peptide yield by extraction from the gel. Many protocols contain an additional fraction of acetonitrile to the extraction solution which, in concentrations above 30% (v/v), is effective in reducing the adsorption of peptides to the surface of reaction tubes and pipette tips. The liquid of the pooled extracts is evaporated in a centrifugal evaporator. If the volatile salt ammonium bicarbonate was used for the basic extraction, it is partially removed in the drying process. The dried peptides can be stored at -20 °C for at least six months.

== Critical considerations and actual trends ==
Some major drawbacks of the common protocols for the in-gel digestion are the extended time needed and the multiple processing steps, making the method error-prone with respect to contaminations (especially keratin). These disadvantages were largely removed by the development of optimised protocols and specialised reaction tubes.

More severe than the difficulties with handling are losses of material while processing the samples. The mass spectrometric protein analysis is often performed at the limit of detection, so even small losses can dictate success or failure of the whole analysis. These losses are due to washout during different processing steps, adsorption to the surface of reaction tubes and pipette tips, incomplete extraction of peptides from the gel and/or bad ionisation of single peptides in the mass spectrometer. Depending on the physicochemical properties of the peptides, losses can vary between 15 and 50%. Due to the inherent heterogeneity of the peptides, up to now, a universally valid solution for this major drawback of the method has not been found.

== Commercial implementations ==
The commercial implementations of in-gel digestion have to be divided into products for high and for low throughput laboratories.

=== High-throughput ===
Due to the highly time-consuming and work-intensive standard procedure, the method of in-gel digestion was limited to a relatively small number of protein spots to be processed at a time. Therefore, it has been found to be the ideal object for automation ambitions to overcome these limitations for industrial and service laboratories. Today, in laboratories where in-gel digestion is performed in high-throughput quantities, the procedure is usually automated. The degree of automation varies from simple pipetting robots to highly sophisticated all-in-one solutions, offering an automated workflow from gel to mass spectrometry. The systems usually consist of a spot picker, a digestion robot, and a spotter.

The advantages of the automation other than the larger number of spots to be processed at a time are the reduced manual work and the improved standardisation. Due to the many handling steps of the method, the results of the manual process could vary depending on the dexterity of the user and the risk of contamination is high. Therefore, the quality of the results is described to be one main advantage of the automated process.

Drawbacks of automated solutions are the costs for robots, maintenance and consumables as well as the complicated setup of the process. Since the automated picking needs digitised information of the spot location, the analysis of the gel image for relevant spots has to be done by software requiring standardised imaging methods and special scanners. This lengthy procedure prevents the researcher from spontaneous identifications of a few interesting spots from a single gel as well as the need to operate the systems at full capacity. The resulting amount of data from the subsequent automated MS analysis is another problem of high throughput systems as their quality is often questionable and the evaluation of these data takes significantly longer than the collection.

=== Low-throughput ===
The mentioned drawbacks limit the reasonable use of automated in-gel digestion systems to the routine laboratory whereas the research laboratory with a demand to make a flexible use of the instruments of protein identification more often stays with the manual, low-throughput methods for in-gel digestion and MS analysis. This group of customers is targeted by the industry with several kit systems for in-gel digestion.

Most of the kit systems are mere collections of the chemicals and enzymes needed for the in-gel digestion whereas the underlying protocol remains unchanged from the manual standard procedure described above. The advantage of these products for the inexperienced customer lies in the guaranteed functioning of the diverse solutions in combination with a ready-made protocol for the process.

A few companies have tried to improve the handling process of in-gel digestion to allow even with manual sample preparation an easier and more standardised workflow. The Montage In-Gel Digest Kit from Millipore is based on the standard protocol, but enables processing of a large number of parallel samples by transferring the handling of the gel pieces to a modified 96 well microplate. The solutions for the diverse steps of in-gel digestion are pipetted into the wells of this plate whereas the removal of liquids is performed through the bottom of the wells by a vacuum pump. This system simplifies the handling of the multiple pipetting steps by the use of multichannel pipettes and even pipetting robots. Actually, some manufacturers of high-throughput systems have adopted the system to work with their robots. This illustrates the orientation of this kit solution to laboratories with a larger number of samples.

== See also ==
- Zymography, an unrelated technique in molecular biology which also involves the digestion of proteins in an electrophoretic gel
