= Streptomyces thioluteus =

Scientific classification
- Domain: Bacteria
- Kingdom: Bacillati
- Phylum: Actinomycetota
- Class: Actinomycetes
- Order: Streptomycetales
- Family: Streptomycetaceae
- Genus: Streptomyces
- Species: S. thioluteus

Binomial name
- Streptomyces thioluteus Witt and Stackebrandt 1991

Type strain
- ATCC 12310, BCRC 12428, CBS 642.72, CCRC 12428, CGMCC 4.1930, CIP 108140, DSM 40027, DSM 41486, HUT-6071, IAM W6-5, IFO 13341, IFO 3364, IPV 1979, ISP 5027, JCM 4087, JCM 4182, JCM 4844, KCC S-0087, KCC S-0844, LMG 20253, NBRC 13341, NBRC 3364, NIHJ 26 a, NIHJ 26 A, NIHJZ-6-25, NRRL B-1667, NRRL B-1667, NRRL-ISP 5027, Okami 26-A, RIA 1302, VKM Ac-1914

Synonyms
- Streptoverticillium thioluteum (Okami 1952) Baldacci et al. 1966 (Approved Lists 1980); "Streptomyces thioluteus" Okami 1952; "Verticillomyces thioluteus" (Okami 1952) Shinobu 1965

Species of bacterium

Streptomyces thioluteus is a bacterium species from the genus of Streptomyces. Streptomyces thioluteus produces leupeptins, phenazines, phenoxazinones, dioxopiperazines, questiomycin A, aureothricin and aureothin.

== See also ==
- List of Streptomyces species
