= Ion suppression (mass spectrometry) =

Effect causing reduced detector response

Ion suppression in LC-MS and LC-MS/MS refers to reduced detector response, or signal:noise as a manifested effect of competition for ionisation efficiency in the ionisation source, between the analyte(s) of interest and other endogenous or exogenous (e.g. plasticisers extracted from plastic tubes, mobile phase additives) species which have not been removed from the sample matrix during sample preparation. Ion suppression is not strictly a problem unless interfering compounds elute at the same time as the analyte of interest. In cases where ion suppressing species do co-elute with an analyte, the effects on the important analytical parameters including precision, accuracy and limit of detection (analytical sensitivity) can be extensive, severely limiting the validity of an assay's results.

== Proposed mechanisms of ion suppression ==
Put simply, ion suppression describes the adverse effect on detector response due to reduced ionisation efficiency for analyte(s) of interest, resulting from the presence of species in the sample matrix which compete for ionisation, or inhibit efficient ionisation in other ways. Use of MS/MS as a means of detection may give the impression that there are no interfering species present, since no chromatographic impurities are detected. However, species which are not isobaric may still have an adverse effect on the sensitivity, accuracy and precision of the assay owing to suppression of the ionisation of the analyte of interest.

Although the precise chemical and physical factors involved in ion suppression are not fully understood, it has been proposed that basicity, high concentration, mass and more intuitively, co-elution with the analyte of interest are factors which should not be ignored.

The most common atmospheric pressure ionisation techniques used in LC-MS/MS are electrospray ionization (ESI) and atmospheric pressure chemical ionization (APCI). APCI is less prone to pronounced ion suppression than ESI, an inherent property of the respective ionisation mechanisms.

In APCI, the sole source of ion suppression can be attributed to the change of colligative properties in the solute during evaporization (King et al, J. Am. Soc. Mass Spectrom 2000, 11, 942-950).

ESI has a more complex ionisation mechanism, relying heavily on droplet charge excess and as such there are many more factors to consider when exploring the cause of ion suppression. It has been widely observed that for many analytes, at high concentrations, ESI exhibits a loss of detector response linearity, perhaps due to reduced charge excess caused by analyte saturation at the droplet surface, inhibiting subsequent ejection of gas phase ions from further inside the droplet. Thus competition for space and/or charge may be considered as a source of ion suppression in ESI. Both physical and chemical properties of analytes (e.g. basicity and surface activity) determine their inherent ionisation efficiency. Biological sample matrices naturally tend to contain many endogenous species with high basicity and surface activity, hence the total concentration of these species in the sample will quickly reach levels at which ion suppression should be expected.

Another explanation of ion suppression in ESI considers the physical properties of the droplet itself rather than the species present. High concentrations of interfering components give rise to an increased surface tension and viscosity, giving a reduction in desolvation (solvent evaporation), which is known to have a marked effect of ionisation efficiency.

The third proposed theory for ion suppression in ESI relates to the presence of non-volatile species which can either cause co-precipitation of analyte in the droplet (thus preventing ionisation) or prevent the contraction of droplet size to the critical radius required for the ion evaporation and/or charge residue mechanisms to form gas phase ions efficiently.

It is worthwhile to consider that the degree of ion suppression may be dependent on the concentration of the analyte being monitored. A higher analyte/matrix ratio can give a reduced effect of ion suppression.

== Approaches to negating ion suppression ==
There are several strategies for removal and/or negation of ion suppression. These approaches may require in-depth understanding of the ionisation mechanisms involved in different ionisation sources or may be completely independent of the physical factors involved.

=== Chromatographic separation ===
If the chromatographic separation can be modified to prevent coelution of suppressing species then other approaches need not be considered. The effect of chromatographic modification may be evaluated using the detector response monitoring under constant infusion approach described previously.

=== Sample preparation ===
An effective sample preparation protocol, usually involving either liquid-liquid extraction (LLE) or solid phase extraction (SPE) and frequently derivatisation can remove ion suppressing species from the sample matrix prior to analysis. These common approaches may also remove other interferences, such as isobaric species.

Protein precipitation is another method that can be employed for small molecule analysis. Removal of all protein species from the sample matrix may be effective in some cases, although for many analytes, ion suppressing species are not of protein origin and so this technique is often used in conjunction with extraction and derivatisation.

=== Sample concentration and mobile phase flow rate ===
Dilution of sample or reducing the volume of sample injected may give a reduction of ion suppression by reducing the quantity of interfering species present, although the quantity of analyte of interest will also be reduced, making this an undesirable approach for trace analysis.

Similar is the effect of reducing the mobile phase flow rate to the nanolitre-per-minute range since, in addition to resulting in improved desolvation, the smaller droplets formed are more tolerant to the presence of non-volatile species in the sample matrix.

=== Choice of ionization source ===
APCI generally suffers less ion suppression than ESI, as discussed previously. Where possible, if ion suppression is unavoidable it may be advisable to switch from ESI to APCI. If this is not possible, it may be useful to switch the ESI ionisation mode from positive to negative. Since fewer compounds are ionisable in negative ionisation mode, it is entirely possible that the ion suppressing species may be removed from the analysis. However, it should also be considered that the analyte of interest may not be ionised effectively in negative mode either, rendering this approach useless.
