= 1-(Furan-2-yl)undecan-1-ol =

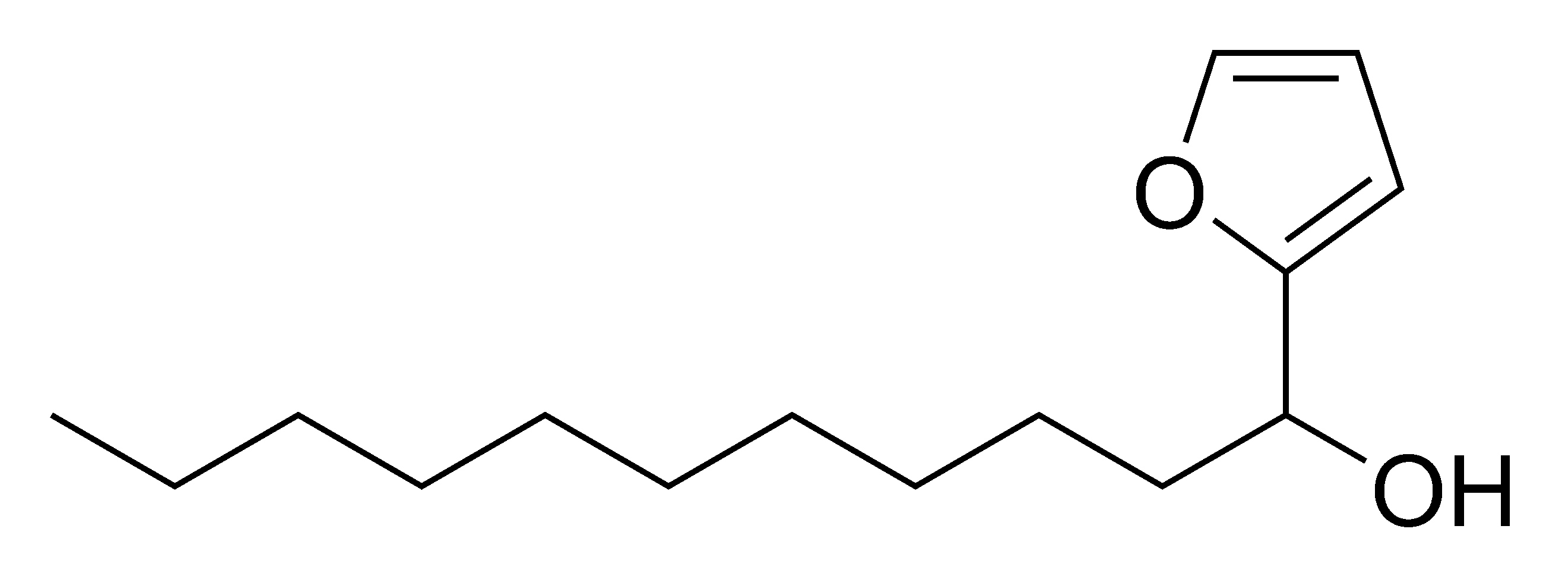

Names
- Preferred IUPAC name 1-(Furan-2-yl)undecan-1-ol

Identifiers
| 3D model (JSmol) | Interactive image |
| ChemSpider | 8927769 |
| PubChem CID | 10752445 |
- InChI: InChI=1/C15H26O2/c1-2-3-4-5-6-7-8-9-11-14(16)15-12-10-13-17-15/h10,12-14,16H,2-9,11H2,1H3 Key: XDKMPPWBMLMXLH-UHFFFAOYSA-N
- SMILES: CCCCCCCCCCC(O)C1=CC=CO1

Properties
| Chemical formula | C_{15}H_{26}O_{2} |
| Molar mass | 238.371 g·mol^{−1} |
- Except where otherwise noted, data are given for materials in their standard state (at 25 °C [77 °F], 100 kPa). Infobox references

1-(Furan-2-yl)undecan-1-ol is an uncharged lipophilic degradation product of the surfactant ProteasMAX.
