= Leucine N-acetyltransferase =

Identifiers
- EC no.: 2.3.1.66
- CAS no.: 75496-56-9

Databases
- IntEnz: IntEnz view
- BRENDA: BRENDA entry
- ExPASy: NiceZyme view
- KEGG: KEGG entry
- MetaCyc: metabolic pathway
- PRIAM: profile
- PDB structures: RCSB PDB PDBe PDBsum
- Gene Ontology: AmiGO / QuickGO
Search
- PMC: articles
- PubMed: articles
- NCBI: proteins

Leucine N-acetyltransferase (EC 2.3.1.66) is an enzyme characterised from Streptomyces roseus that catalyzes the chemical reaction

leucine
+
acetyl-CoA
levacetylleucine
+
+ coenzyme A

Leupeptin

The two substrates of this enzyme are L-leucine and acetyl-CoA. Its products are levacetylleucine and coenzyme A. The product is incorporated into the protease inhibitor, leupeptin.

This enzyme belongs to the family of transferases, specifically those acyltransferases transferring groups other than aminoacyl groups. The systematic name of this enzyme class is acetyl-CoA:L-leucine N-acetyltransferase. This enzyme is also called leucine acetyltransferase.
