= Leupeptin =

- Stereo, skeletal formula of leupeptin

Names
- IUPAC name N-Acetyl-leucyl-N-{[5-[(diaminomethylidene)amino]-1-oxopentan-2-yl}-leucinamide

Identifiers
| CAS Number | 55123-66-5 |
| 3D model (JSmol) | Interactive image |
| ChEBI | CHEBI:6426 |
| ChemSpider | 65357 |
| ECHA InfoCard | 100.212.237 |
| PubChem CID | 72429 |
| UNII | J97339NR3V |
| CompTox Dashboard (EPA) | DTXSID1020776 |
- InChI: InChI=1S/C20H38N6O4/c1-12(2)9-16(24-14(5)28)19(30)26-17(10-13(3)4)18(29)25-15(11-27)7-6-8-23-20(21)22/h11-13,15-17H,6-10H2,1-5H3,(H,24,28)(H,25,29)(H,26,30)(H4,21,22,23)/t15-,16-,17-/m0/s1 Key: GDBQQVLCIARPGH-ULQDDVLXSA-N
- SMILES: CC(C)C[C@H](NC(C)=O)C(=O)N[C@@H](CC(C)C)C(=O)N[C@@H](CCCNC(N)=N)C=O

Properties
| Chemical formula | C_{20}H_{38}N_{6}O_{4} |
| Molar mass | 426.562 g·mol^{−1} |

Related compounds
| Related alkanamides | Gusperimus |
| Related compounds | Synthalin |
- Except where otherwise noted, data are given for materials in their standard state (at 25 °C [77 °F], 100 kPa). Infobox references

Leupeptin, also known as N-acetyl-L-leucyl-L-leucyl-L-argininal, is a naturally occurring protease inhibitor that can inhibit cysteine, serine and threonine peptidases.

It is often used during in vitro experiments when a specific enzymatic reaction is being studied. When cells are lysed for these studies, proteases, many of which are contained within lysosomes, are released. These proteases, if freely present in the lysate, would destroy any products from the reaction being studied, and make the experiment uninterpretable. For example, leupeptin could be used in a calpain extraction to keep calpain from being hydrolyzed by specific proteases. The suggested concentration is 1-10 μM (0.5-5 μg/ml).

Leupeptin is an organic compound produced by actinomycetes, which inhibits serine, cysteine and threonine proteases. Leupeptin inhibits serine proteinases (trypsin (K_{i}=3.5 nM), plasmin (K_{i}= 3.4 nM), porcine kallikrein), and cysteine proteinases (papain, cathepsin B (K_{i} = 4.1 nM), endoproteinase Lys-C). It does not inhibit α-chymotrypsin or thrombin. Leupeptin is a competitive transition state inhibitor and its inhibition may be relieved by an excess of substrate.

Leupeptin is soluble in water (stable for 1 week at 4 °C and 1 month at −20 °C), ethanol, acetic acid and DMF.

It can be given topically for middle and inner ear infections.

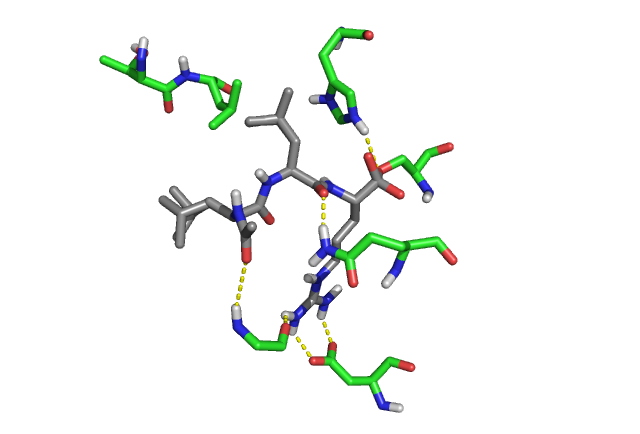
Crystal structure of Leupeptin (silver) in the Trypsin (green) binding pocket. Hydrogen bonds are shown as yellow dotted lines. Rendered from PDB 1JRS.

== Biosynthesis ==
The biosyntheis of leupeptin in a Streptomyces species has been studied. It is a tripeptide and its synthesis from its component amino acids begins when L-leucine is converted to levacetylleucine by the enzyme leucine N-acetyltransferase.

leucine
+
acetyl-CoA
levacetylleucine
+
+ coenzyme A

The next steps are the addition of a second L-leucine fragment, adding an amide bond, followed by L-arginine, giving leupeptin acid. In the final step, the acid terminus from the arginine is reduced to its aldehyde.
