= Cleavable detergent =

Cleavable detergents, also known as cleavable surfactants, are special surfactants (detergents) that are used in biochemistry and especially in proteomics to enhance protein denaturation and solubility. The detergent is rendered inactive by cleavage, usually under acidic conditions, in order to make the sample compatible with a following procedure or in order to selectively remove the cleavage products.

Applications for cleavable detergents include protease digestion of proteins such as in-gel digestion with trypsin after SDS PAGE and peptide extractions from electrophoresis gels. Cleavable detergents are mainly used in sample preparations for mass spectrometry.

== PPS ==
PPS, available as PPS Silent Surfactant from Expedeon, is the abbreviation for sodium 3-(4-(1,1-bis(hexyloxy)ethyl)pyridinium-1-yl)propane-1-sulfonate. This acetalic detergent is split under acidic conditions into hexanol and the zwitterionic 3-acetyl-1-(3-sulfopropyl)pyridinium.

== ProteaseMAX ==
ProteaseMAX'is the brandname of Promega for sodium 3-((1-(furan-2-yl)undecyloxy)carbonylamino)propane-1-sulfonate. This cleavable detergent is sensitive to heat and acid and is degraded during a typical trypsin digestion into the uncharged lipophilic compound 1-(furan-2-yl)undecan-1-ol and the zwitterionic 3-aminopropane-1-sulfonic acid (homotaurine), which can be removed by C18 solid phase extraction during sample work-up.

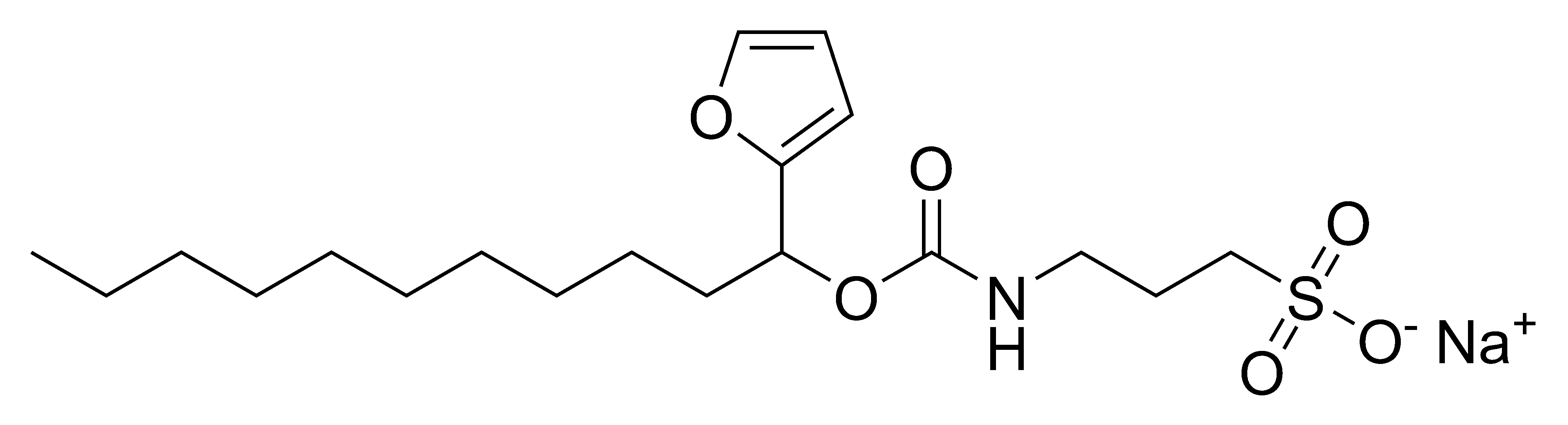
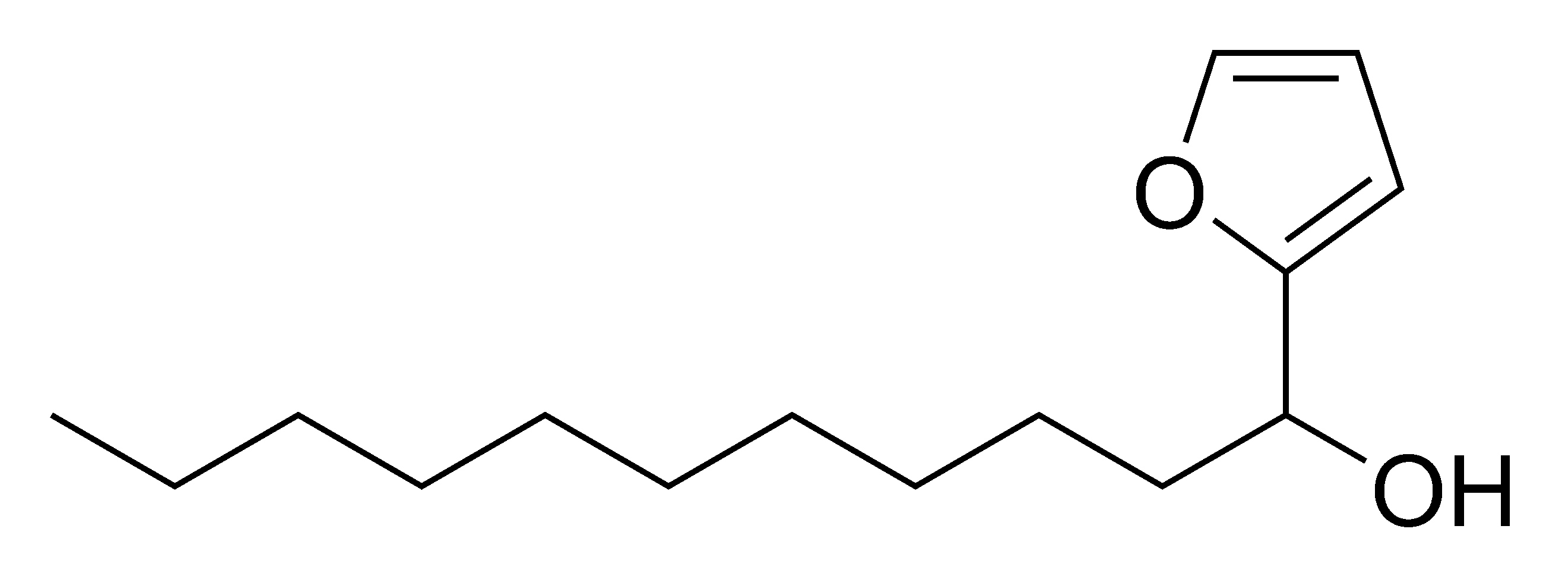
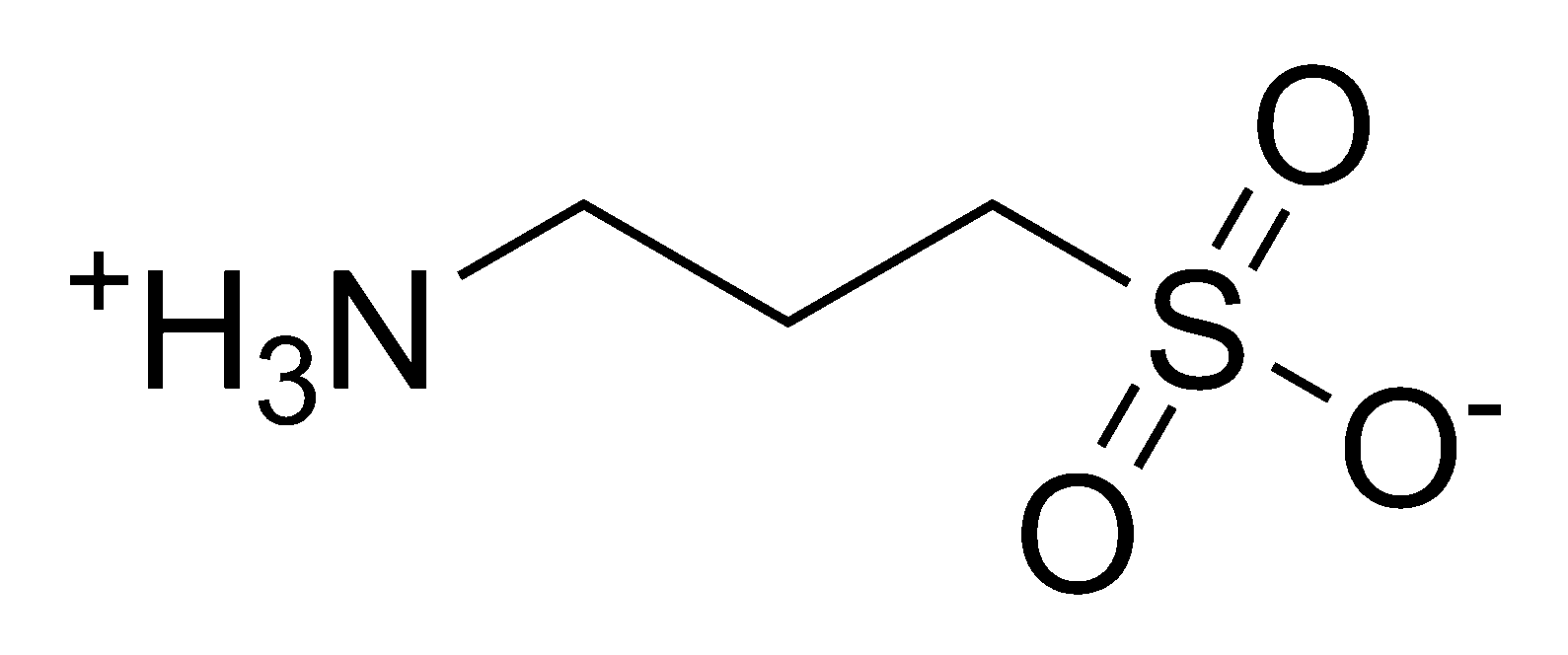
$\longrightarrow$ $+$

== RapiGest SF ==
RapiGest SF, the brand-name for sodium 3-[(2-methyl-2-undecyl-1,3-dioxolan-4-yl)methoxy]-1-propanesulfonate, is an acid-cleavable anionic detergent marketed by Waters Corporation and AOBIOUS INC.

== Others ==
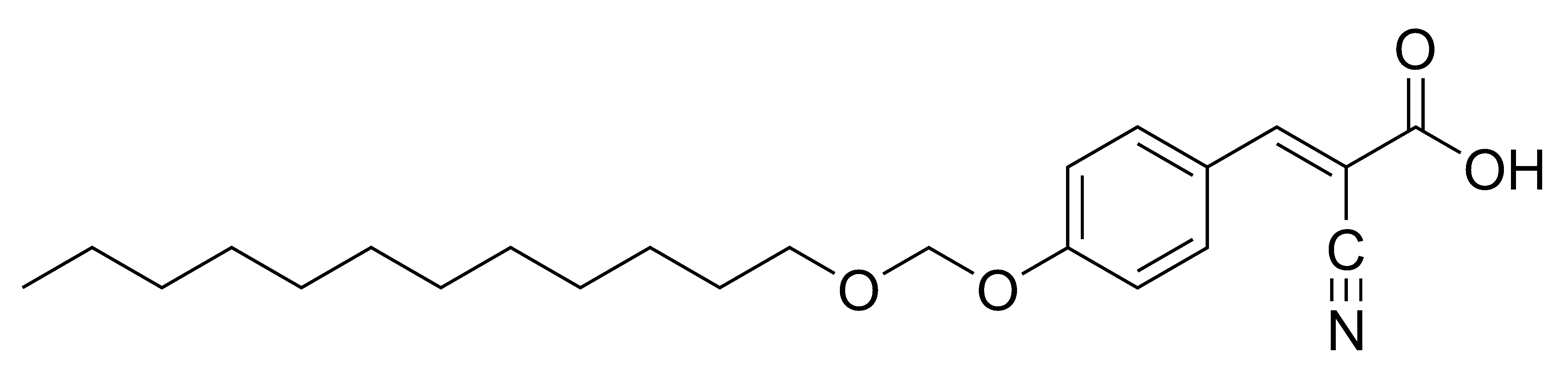
Functionalized matrix detergent

MALDI matrix compounds such as α-cyano-4-hydroxycinnamic acid have been linked through a linker consisting of an unsymmetric formaldehyde acetals to dodecanol. This type of cleavable detergent is inherently compatible with MALDI and does not have to be removed prior to analysis.

UV light- or fluoride-cleavable surfactants have also been developed but are not in current use.
