= Aureothin =

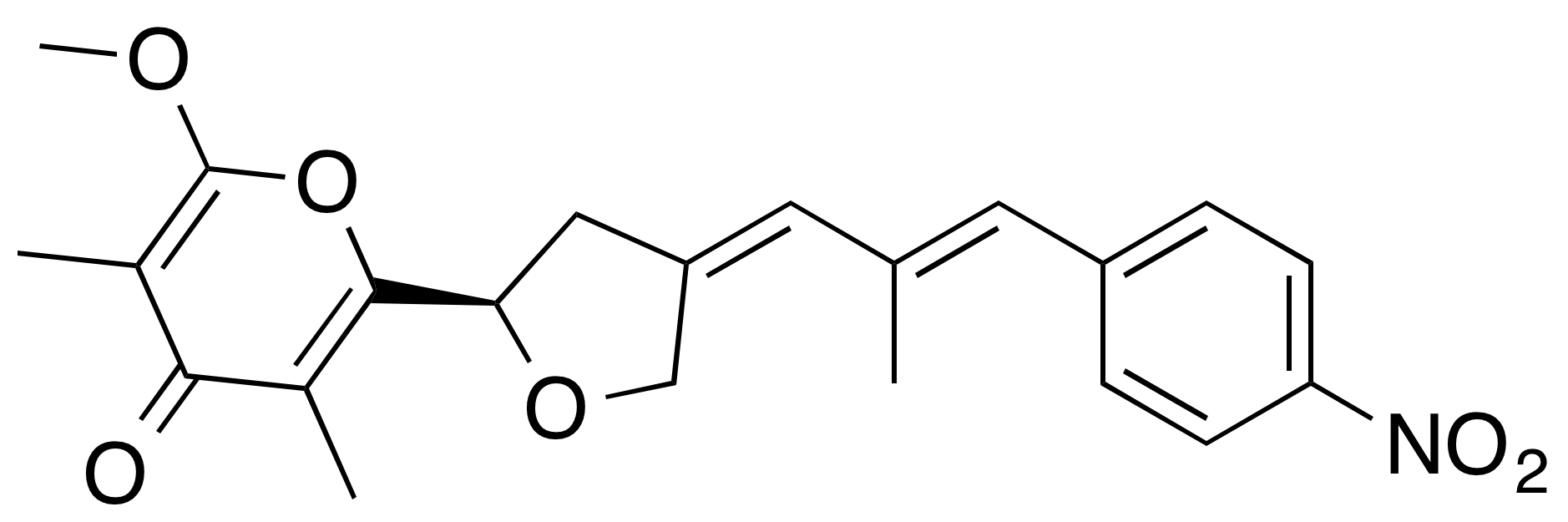

Names
- IUPAC name 2-methoxy-3,5-dimethyl-6-[(2R,4Z)-4-[(E)-2-methyl-3-(4-nitrophenyl)prop-2-enylidene]oxolan-2-yl]pyran-4-one

Identifiers
CAS Number	2825-00-5
3D model (JSmol)	Interactive image
ChEBI	CHEBI:80024
ChemSpider	5029106
KEGG	C15689
PubChem CID	6569946
UNII	G359FGQ2RB
- InChI: InChI=1S/C22H23NO6/c1-13(9-16-5-7-18(8-6-16)23(25)26)10-17-11-19(28-12-17)21-14(2)20(24)15(3)22(27-4)29-21/h5-10,19H,11-12H2,1-4H3/b13-9+,17-10-/t19-/m1/s1 Key: GQKXCBCSVYJUMI-WACKOAQBSA-N
- SMILES: CC1=C(OC(=C(C1=O)C)OC)[C@H]2C/C(=C/C(=C/C3=CC=C(C=C3)[N+](=O)[O-])/C)/CO2

Properties
Chemical formula	C_{22}H_{23}NO_{6}
Molar mass	397.427 g·mol^{−1}
- Except where otherwise noted, data are given for materials in their standard state (at 25 °C [77 °F], 100 kPa). Infobox references

Aureothin is a natural product of a cytotoxic shikimate-polyketide antibiotic with the molecular formula C_{22}H_{23}NO_{6}. Aureothin is produced by the bacterium Streptomyces thioluteus that illustrates antitumor, antifungal, and insecticidal activities and the new aureothin derivatives can be antifungal and antiproliferative. In addition, aureothin, a nitro compound from Streptomyces thioluteus, was indicated to have pesticidal activity against the bean weevil by interfering with mitochondrial respiratory complex II.

== Biosynthesis ==
Regarding the biosynthesis of aureothin, the biosynthetic pathway would be begun with chorismic acid. p-Nitrobenzoate is derived from p-aminobenzoate by an N-oxygenase, which is encoded by aurF. The aurF is one of the aureothin biosynthetic enzymes and it is referred to as a nonheme diiron oxygenase that is responsible for converting p-aminobenzoate to p-nitrobenzoate. Moreover, the aurF catalyzes a reaction of a complete six-electron oxidation utilizing two equivalents of dioxygen and two exogenous electrons in order to convert p-aminobenzoate to p-nitrobenzoate. Then, three type I polyketide synthases (PKSs), which is encoded by aurA, aurB, and aurC, generates the a polyketide chain using p-nitrobenzoate as a starter unit for the biosynthesis of aureothin. At this point, the repetition that one molecule catalyzes two successive cycles of chain extension would occur in the reaction of the type I PKS. In particular, the two consecutive cycles containing four times of methylmalonyl-CoA and one time of malonyl-CoA occur during the type I PKS. After O-methylation is activated by a methyltransferase, which is encoded by aurI, the tetrahydrofuran ring formation is produced by a monooxygenase that is encoded by aurH. Therefore, the final product, aureothin, is produced as a result of the monooxygenase encoded by aurH.

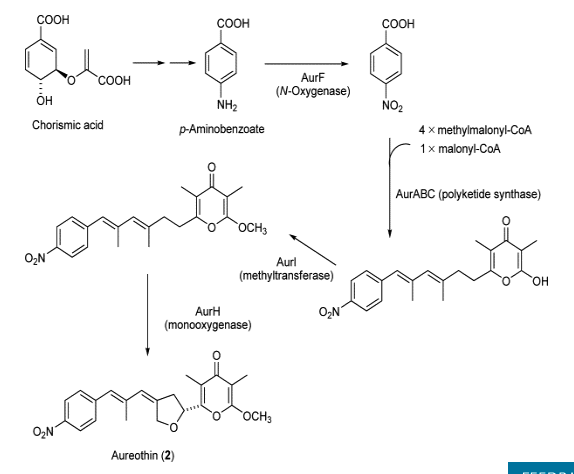
The biosynthetic pathway of aureothin
