= Liquid chromatography–mass spectrometry =

Analytical chemistry technique

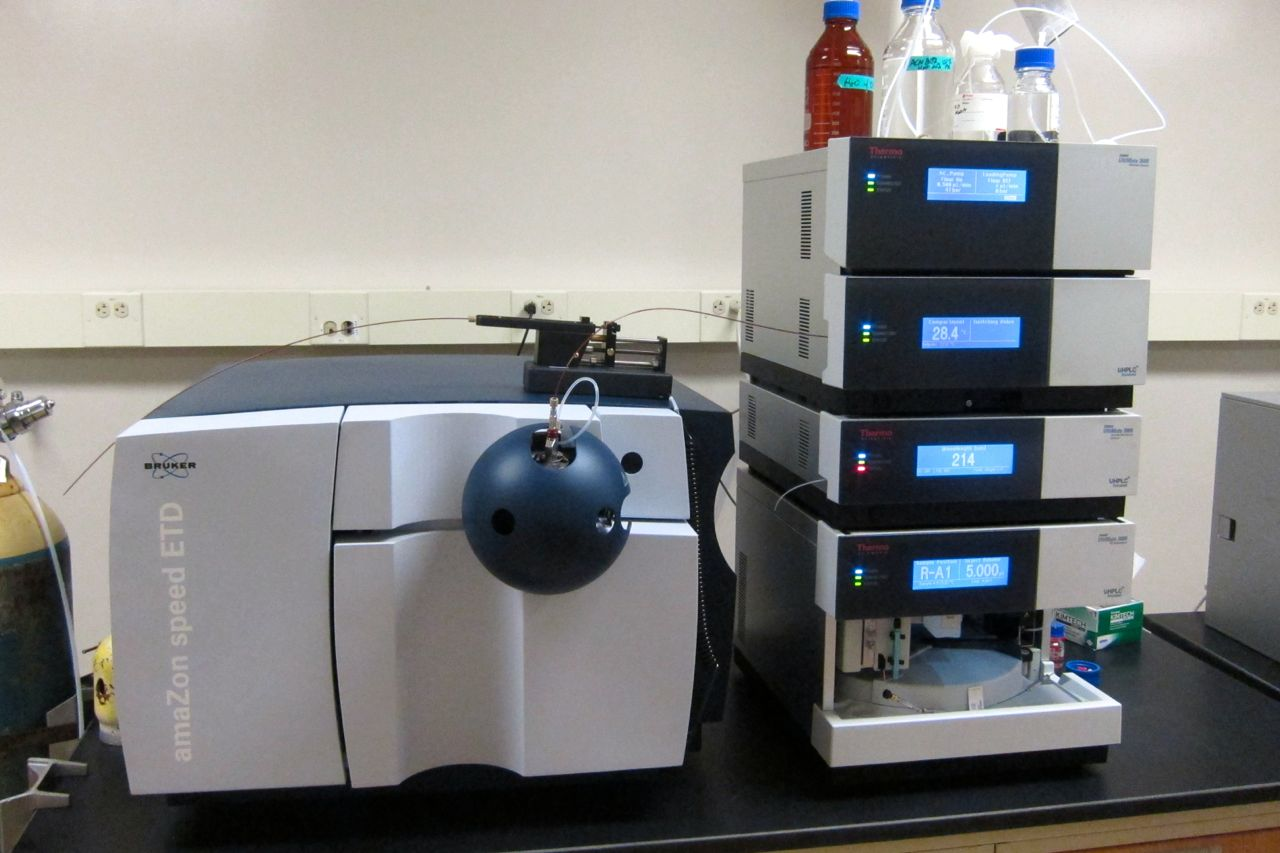
- Ion trap LCMS system with ESI interface
- Acronym: LCMS
- Classification: Chromatography; Mass spectrometry
- Analytes: organic molecules biomolecules
- Manufacturers: Agilent; Bruker; PerkinElmer; SCIEX; Shimadzu Scientific; Thermo Fisher Scientific; Waters Corporation

Other techniques
- Related: Gas chromatography–mass spectrometry

Liquid chromatography–mass spectrometry (LC–MS) is an analytical chemistry technique that combines the physical separation capabilities of liquid chromatography (or HPLC) with the mass analysis capabilities of mass spectrometry (MS). Coupled chromatography–MS systems are popular in chemical analysis because the individual capabilities of each technique are enhanced synergistically. While liquid chromatography separates mixtures with multiple components, mass spectrometry provides spectral information that may help to identify (or confirm the suspected identity of) each separated component. MS is not only sensitive, but provides selective detection, relieving the need for complete chromatographic separation. LC–MS is also appropriate for metabolomics because of its good coverage of a wide range of chemicals. This tandem technique can be used to analyze biochemical, organic, and inorganic compounds commonly found in complex samples of environmental and biological origin. Therefore, LC–MS may be applied in a wide range of sectors including biotechnology, environment monitoring, food processing, and pharmaceutical, agrochemical, and cosmetic industries. Since the early 2000s, LC–MS (or more specifically LC–MS/MS) has also begun to be used in clinical applications.

In addition to the liquid chromatography and mass spectrometry devices, an LC–MS system contains an interface that efficiently transfers the separated components from the LC column into the MS ion source. The interface is necessary because the LC and MS devices are fundamentally incompatible. While the mobile phase in a LC system is a pressurized liquid, the MS analyzers commonly operate under high vacuum. Thus, it is not possible to directly pump the eluate from the LC column into the MS source. Overall, the interface is a mechanically simple part of the LC–MS system that transfers the maximum amount of analyte, removes a significant portion of the mobile phase used in LC and preserves the chemical identity of the chromatography products (chemically inert). As a requirement, the interface should not interfere with the ionizing efficiency and vacuum conditions of the MS system. Nowadays, most extensively applied LC–MS interfaces are based on atmospheric pressure ionization (API) strategies like electrospray ionization (ESI), atmospheric-pressure chemical ionization (APCI), and atmospheric pressure photoionization (APPI). These interfaces became available in the 1990s after a two-decade-long research and development process.

== History ==
The coupling of chromatography with MS is a well developed chemical analysis strategy dating back from the 1950s. Gas chromatography (GC)–MS was originally introduced in 1952, when A. T. James and A. J. P. Martin were trying to develop tandem separation – mass analysis techniques. In GC, the analytes are eluted from the separation column as a gas and the connection with electron ionization (EI) or chemical ionization (CI) ion sources in the MS system was a technically simpler challenge. Because of this, the development of GC-MS systems was faster than LC–MS and such systems were first commercialized in the 1970s. The development of LC–MS systems took longer than GC-MS and was directly related to the development of proper interfaces. Victor Talrose and his collaborators in Russia started the development of LC–MS in the late 1960s, when they first used capillaries to connect an LC column to an EI source. A similar strategy was investigated by McLafferty and collaborators in 1973 who coupled the LC column to a CI source, which allowed a higher liquid flow into the source. This was the first and most obvious way of coupling LC with MS, and was known as the capillary inlet interface. This pioneer interface for LC–MS had the same analysis capabilities of GC-MS and was limited to rather volatile analytes and non-polar compounds with low molecular mass (below 400 Da). In the capillary inlet interface, the evaporation of the mobile phase inside the capillary was one of the main issues. Within the first years of development of LC–MS, on-line and off-line alternatives were proposed as coupling alternatives. In general, off-line coupling involved fraction collection, evaporation of solvent, and transfer of analytes to the MS using probes. Off-line analyte treatment process was time-consuming and there was an inherent risk of sample contamination. Rapidly, it was realized that the analysis of complex mixtures would require the development of a fully automated on-line coupling solution in LC–MS.

The key to the success and widespread adoption of LC–MS as a routine analytical tool lies in the interface and ion source between the liquid-based LC and the vacuum-base MS. The following interfaces were stepping-stones on the way to the modern atmospheric-pressure ionization interfaces, and are described for historical interest.

=== Moving-belt interface ===
The moving-belt interface (MBI) was developed by McFadden et al. in 1977 and commercialized by Finnigan. This interface consisted of an endless moving belt onto which the LC column effluent was deposited in a band. On the belt, the solvent was evaporated by gently heating and efficiently exhausting the solvent vapours under reduced pressure in two vacuum chambers. After the liquid phase was removed, the belt passed over a heater which flash desorbed the analytes into the MS ion source. One of the significant advantages of the MBI was its compatibility with a wide range of chromatographic conditions. MBI was successfully used for LC–MS applications between 1978 and 1990 because it allowed coupling of LC to MS devices using EI, CI, and fast-atom bombardment (FAB) ion sources. The most common MS systems connected by MBI interfaces to LC columns were magnetic sector and quadrupole instruments. MBI interfaces for LC–MS allowed MS to be widely applied in the analysis of drugs, pesticides, steroids, alkaloids, and polycyclic aromatic hydrocarbons. This interface is no longer used because of its mechanical complexity and the difficulties associated with belt renewal (or cleaning) as well as its inability to handle very labile biomolecules.

=== Direct liquid-introduction interface ===
The direct liquid-introduction (DLI) interface was developed in 1980. This interface was intended to solve the problem of evaporation of liquid inside the capillary inlet interface. In DLI, a small portion of the LC flow was forced through a small aperture or diaphragm (typically 10 μm in diameter) to form a liquid jet composed of small droplets that were subsequently dried in a desolvation chamber. The analytes were ionized using a solvent-assisted chemical ionization source, where the LC solvents acted as reagent gases. To use this interface, it was necessary to split the flow coming out of the LC column because only a small portion of the effluent (10 to 50 μl/min out of 1 ml/min) could be introduced into the source without raising the vacuum pressure of the MS system too high. Alternately, Henion at Cornell University had success with using micro-bore LC methods so that the entire (low) flow of the LC could be used. One of the main operational problems of the DLI interface was the frequent clogging of the diaphragm orifices. The DLI interface was used between 1982 and 1985 for the analysis of pesticides, corticosteroids, metabolites in horse urine, erythromycin, and vitamin B_{12}. However, this interface was replaced by the thermospray interface, which removed the flow rate limitations and the issues with the clogging diaphragms.

A related device was the particle beam interface (PBI), developed by Willoughby and Browner in 1984. Particle beam interfaces took over the wide applications of MBI for LC–MS in 1988. The PBI operated by using a helium gas nebulizer to spray the eluant into the vacuum, drying the droplets and pumping away the solvent vapour (using a jet separator) while the stream of monodisperse dried particles containing the analyte entered the source. Drying the droplets outside of the source volume, and using a jet separator to pump away the solvent vapour, allowed the particles to enter and be vapourized in a low-pressure EI source. As with the MBI, the ability to generate library-searchable EI spectra was a distinct advantage for many applications. Commercialized by Hewlett Packard, and later by VG and Extrel, it enjoyed moderate success, but has been largely supplanted by the atmospheric pressure interfaces such as electrospray and APCI which provide a broader range of compound coverage and applications.

=== Thermospray interface ===
The thermospray (TSP) interface was developed in 1980 by Marvin Vestal and co-workers at the University of Houston. It was commercialized by Vestec and several of the major mass spectrometer manufacturers. The interface resulted from a long-term research project intended to find a LC–MS interface capable of handling high flow rates (1 ml/min) and avoiding the flow split in DLI interfaces. The TSP interface was composed of a heated probe, a desolvation chamber, and an ion focusing skimmer. The LC effluent passed through the heated probe and emerged as a jet of vapor and small droplets flowing into the desolvation chamber at low pressure. Initially operated with a filament or discharge as the source of ions (thereby acting as a CI source for vapourized analyte), it was soon discovered that ions were also observed when the filament or discharge was off. This could be attributed to either direct emission of ions from the liquid droplets as they evaporated in a process related to electrospray ionization or ion evaporation, or to chemical ionization of vapourized analyte molecules from buffer ions (such as ammonium acetate). The fact that multiply-charged ions were observed from some larger analytes suggests that direct analyte ion emission was occurring under at least some conditions. The interface was able to handle up to 2 ml/min of eluate from the LC column and would efficiently introduce it into the MS vacuum system. TSP was also more suitable for LC–MS applications involving reversed phase liquid chromatography (RT-LC). With time, the mechanical complexity of TSP was simplified, and this interface became popular as the first ideal LC–MS interface for pharmaceutical applications comprising the analysis of drugs, metabolites, conjugates, nucleosides, peptides, natural products, and pesticides. The introduction of TSP marked a significant improvement for LC–MS systems and was the most widely applied interface until the beginning of the 1990s, when it began to be replaced by interfaces involving atmospheric pressure ionization (API).

=== FAB based interfaces ===
The first fast atom bombardment (FAB) and continuous flow-FAB (CF-FAB) interfaces were developed in 1985 and 1986 respectively. Both interfaces were similar, but they differed in that the first used a porous frit probe as connecting channel, while CF-FAB used a probe tip. From these, the CF-FAB was more successful as a LC–MS interface and was useful to analyze non-volatile and thermally labile compounds. In these interfaces, the LC effluent passed through the frit or CF-FAB channels to form a uniform liquid film at the tip. There, the liquid was bombarded with ion beams or high energy atoms (fast atoms). For stable operation, the FAB based interfaces were able to handle liquid flow rates of only 1–15 μl and were also restricted to microbore and capillary columns. In order to be used in FAB MS ionization sources, the analytes of interest had to be mixed with a matrix (e.g., glycerol) that could be added before or after the separation in the LC column. FAB based interfaces were extensively used to characterize peptides, but lost applicability with the advent of electrospray based interfaces in 1988.

== Liquid chromatography ==
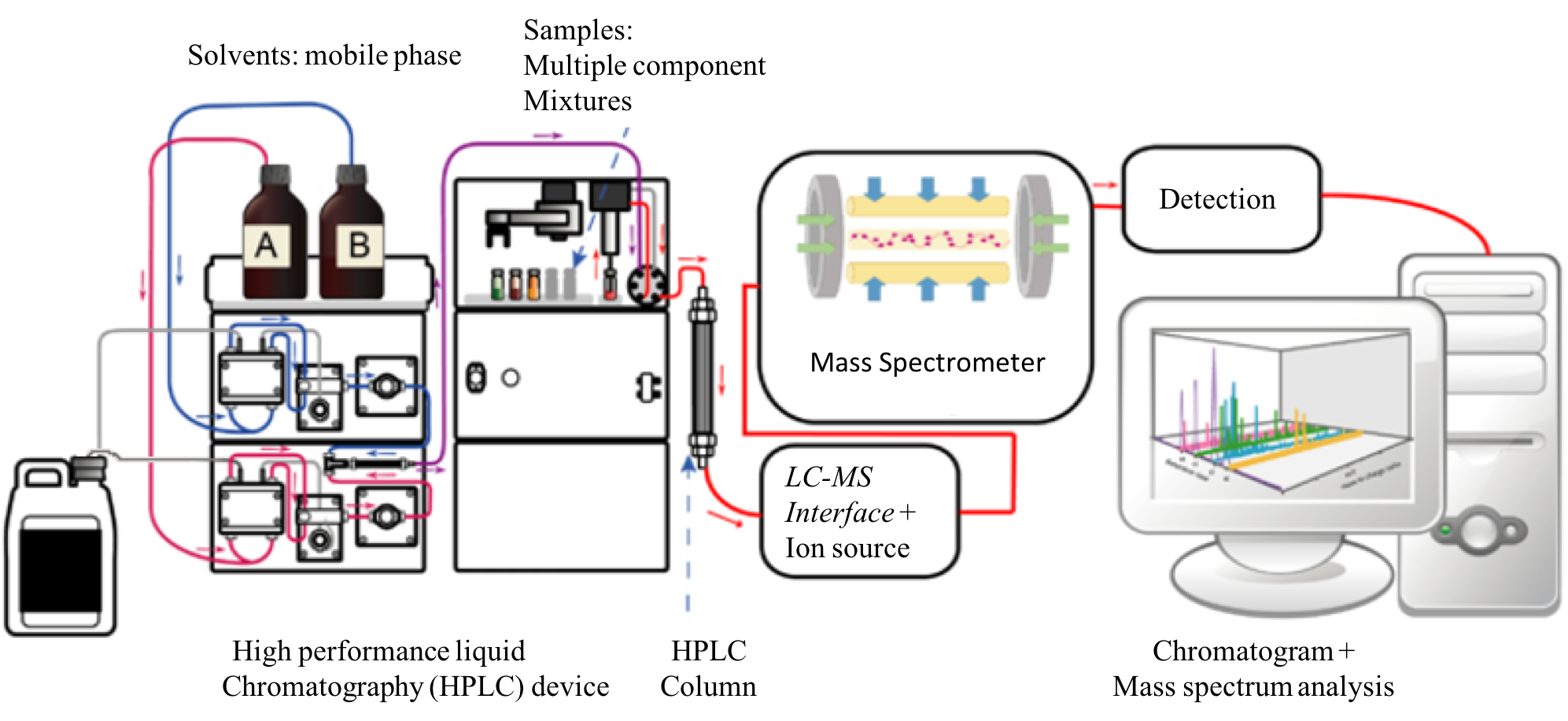
Diagram of an LC–MS system

Liquid chromatography is a method of physical separation in which the components of a liquid mixture are distributed between two immiscible phases, called the stationary and mobile phases. The practice of LC can be divided into five categories: adsorption chromatography, partition chromatography, ion-exchange chromatography, size-exclusion chromatography, and affinity chromatography. Among these, the most widely used variant is the reverse-phase (RP) mode of the partition chromatography technique, which makes use of a nonpolar (hydrophobic) stationary phase and a polar mobile phase. In common applications, the mobile phase is a mixture of water and other polar solvents (such as methanol, isopropanol, and acetonitrile), and the stationary matrix is prepared by attaching long-chain alkyl groups (such as n-octadecyl or C_{18}) to the external and internal surfaces of irregularly or spherically shaped, 5 μm diameter, porous silica particles.

In HPLC, typically 20 μl of the sample of interest are injected into the mobile phase stream delivered by a high pressure pump. The mobile phase containing the analytes permeates through the stationary phase bed in a definite direction. The components of the mixture are separated depending on their chemical affinity with the mobile and stationary phases. The separation occurs after repeated sorption and desorption steps occurring when the liquid interacts with the stationary bed. The liquid solvent (mobile phase) is delivered under high pressure (up to 400 bar or 5800 psi) into a packed column containing the stationary phase. The high pressure is necessary to achieve a constant flow rate for reproducible chromatography experiments. Depending on the partitioning between the mobile and stationary phases, the components of the sample will flow out of the column at different times. The column is the most important component of the LC system and is designed to withstand the high pressure of the liquid. Conventional LC columns are 100–300 mm long with an outer diameter of 6.4 mm (1/4 inch) and an internal diameter of 3.0–4.6 mm. For applications involving LC–MS, the length of chromatography columns can be shorter (30–50 mm) with 3–5 μm diameter packing particles. In addition to the conventional model, other LC columns are the narrow bore, microbore, microcapillary, and nano-LC models. These columns have smaller internal diameters, allow for a more efficient separation, and handle liquid flows under 1 ml/min (the conventional flow-rate). In order to improve separation efficiency and peak resolution, ultra performance liquid chromatography (UHPLC) can be used instead of HPLC. This LC variant uses columns packed with smaller silica particles (about 1.7 μm diameter) and requires higher operating pressures in the range of 310000 to 775000 torr (6000 to 15000 psi, 400 to 1034 bar).

== Mass spectrometry ==
LC–MS spectrum of each resolved peak

Mass spectrometry (MS) is an analytical technique that measures the mass-to-charge ratio (m/z) of charged particles (ions). Although there are many different kinds of mass spectrometers, all of them make use of electric or magnetic fields to manipulate the motion of ions produced from an analyte of interest and determine their m/z. The basic components of a mass spectrometer are the ion source, the mass analyzer, the detector, and the data and vacuum systems. The ion source is where the components of a sample introduced in a MS system are ionized by means of electron beams, photon beams (UV lights), laser beams or corona discharge. In the case of electrospray ionization, the ion source moves ions that exist in liquid solution into the gas phase. The ion source converts and fragments the neutral sample molecules into gas-phase ions that are sent to the mass analyzer. While the mass analyzer applies the electric and magnetic fields to sort the ions by their masses, the detector measures and amplifies the ion current to calculate the abundances of each mass-resolved ion. In order to generate a mass spectrum that a human eye can easily recognize, the data system records, processes, stores, and displays data in a computer.

The mass spectrum can be used to determine the mass of the analytes, their elemental and isotopic composition, or to elucidate the chemical structure of the sample. MS is an experiment that must take place in gas phase and under vacuum conditions (1.33 * 10^{−2} to 1.33 * 10^{−6} pascal). Therefore, the development of devices facilitating the transition from samples at higher pressure and in condensed phase (solid or liquid) into a vacuum system has been essential to develop MS as a potent tool for identification and quantification of organic compounds like peptides. MS is now in very common use in analytical laboratories that study physical, chemical, or biological properties of a great variety of compounds. Among the many different kinds of mass analyzers, the ones that find application in LC–MS systems are the quadrupole, time-of-flight (TOF), ion traps, and hybrid quadrupole-TOF (QTOF) analyzers.

== Interfaces ==
The interface between a liquid phase technique (HPLC) with a continuously flowing eluate, and a gas phase technique carried out in a vacuum was difficult for a long time. The advent of electrospray ionization changed this. Currently, the most common LC–MS interfaces are electrospray ionization (ESI), atmospheric pressure chemical ionization (APCI), and atmospheric pressure photo-ionization (APPI). These are newer MS ion sources that facilitate the transition from a high pressure environment (HPLC) to high vacuum conditions needed at the MS analyzer. Although these interfaces are described individually, they can also be commercially available as dual ESI/APCI, ESI/APPI, or APCI/APPI ion sources. Various deposition and drying techniques, including moving belts, were used in the past, but the most common of these was the off-line MALDI deposition. A new approach still under development, called direct-EI LC–MS interface, couples a nano HPLC system and an electron ionization equipped mass spectrometer.

=== Electrospray ionization (ESI) ===
ESI interface for LC–MS systems was developed by Fenn and collaborators in 1988. This ion source/ interface can be used for the analysis of moderately polar and even very polar molecules (such as metabolites, xenobiotics, peptides, nucleotides, and polysaccharides). The liquid eluate coming out of the LC column is directed into a metal capillary kept at 3 to 5 kV and is nebulized by a high-velocity coaxial flow of gas at the tip of the capillary, creating a fine spray of charged droplets in front of the entrance to the vacuum chamber. To avoid contamination of the vacuum system by buffers and salts, this capillary is usually perpendicularly located at the inlet of the MS system, in some cases with a counter-current of dry nitrogen in front of the entrance through which ions are directed by the electric field. In some sources, rapid droplet evaporation and thus maximum ion emission is achieved by mixing an additional stream of hot gas with the spray plume in front of the vacuum entrance. In other sources, the droplets are drawn through a heated capillary tube as they enter the vacuum, promoting droplet evaporation and ion emission. These methods of increasing droplet evaporation now allow the use of liquid flow rates of 1–2 mL/min to be used while still achieving efficient ionisation and high sensitivity. As a result, while the use of 1–3 mm microbore columns and lower flow rates of 50–200 μl/min was commonly considered necessary for optimum operation in the past, this limitation is no longer as important, and the higher column capacity of larger bore columns can now be advantageously employed with ESI LC–MS systems. Positively and negatively charged ions can be created by switching polarities, and it is possible to acquire alternate positive and negative mode spectra rapidly within the same LC run. While most large molecules (greater than MW 1500–2000) produce multiply charged ions in the ESI source, the majority of smaller molecules produce singly charged ions.

=== Atmospheric pressure chemical ionization (APCI) ===
The development of the APCI interface for LC–MS started with Horning and collaborators in the early 1973. However, its commercial application was introduced at the beginning of the 1990s after Henion and collaborators improved the LC–APCI–MS interface in 1986. The APCI ion source/ interface can be used to analyze small, neutral, relatively non-polar, and thermally stable molecules (such as steroids, lipids, and fat soluble vitamins). These compounds are not well ionized using ESI. In addition, APCI can also handle mobile phase streams containing buffering agents. The liquid from the LC system is pumped through a capillary and there is also nebulization at the tip, where a corona discharge takes place. First, the ionizing gas surrounding the interface and the mobile phase solvent are subject to chemical ionization at the ion source. Later, these ions react with the analyte and transfer their charge. The sample ions then pass through small orifice skimmers by means of ion-focusing lenses. Once inside the high vacuum region, the ions are subject to mass analysis. This interface can be operated in positive and negative charge modes and singly-charged ions are mainly produced. APCI ion source can also handle flow rates between 500 and 2000 μl/min and it can be directly connected to conventional 4.6 mm ID columns.

=== Atmospheric pressure photoionization (APPI) ===
The APPI interface for LC–MS was developed simultaneously by Bruins and Syage in 2000. APPI is another LC–MS ion source/ interface for the analysis of neutral compounds that cannot be ionized using ESI. This interface is similar to the APCI ion source, but instead of a corona discharge, the ionization occurs by using photons coming from a discharge lamp. In the direct-APPI mode, singly charged analyte molecular ions are formed by absorption of a photon and ejection of an electron. In the dopant-APPI mode, an easily ionizable compound (dopant) is added to the mobile phase or the nebulizing gas to promote a reaction of charge-exchange between the dopant molecular ion and the analyte. The ionized sample is later transferred to the mass analyzer at high vacuum as it passes through small orifice skimmers.

== Applications ==
The coupling of MS with LC systems is attractive because liquid chromatography can separate delicate and complex natural mixtures whose chemical composition needs to be well established, such as biological fluids, environmental samples, and drugs. Further, LC–MS has applications in volatile explosive residue analysis. Nowadays, LC–MS has become one of the most widely used chemical analysis techniques because more than 85% of natural chemical compounds are polar and thermally labile, and GC-MS cannot process these samples. As an example, HPLC–MS is regarded as the leading analytical technique for proteomics and pharmaceutical laboratories. Other important applications of LC–MS include the analysis of food, pesticides, and plant phenols.

=== Pharmacokinetics ===
LC–MS is widely used in the field of bioanalysis and is specially involved in pharmacokinetic studies of pharmaceuticals. Pharmacokinetic studies are needed to determine how quickly a drug will be cleared from the body organs and the hepatic (liver) blood flow. MS analyzers are useful in these studies because of their shorter analysis time, and higher sensitivity and specificity compared to UV detectors commonly attached to HPLC systems. One major advantage is the use of tandem MS–MS, where the detector may be programmed to select certain ions to fragment. The measured quantity is the sum of molecule fragments chosen by the operator. As long as there are no interferences or ion suppression in LC–MS, the LC separation can be done quite swiftly.

=== Proteomics/metabolomics ===
LC–MS is used in proteomics as a method to detect and identify the components of a complex mixture. The bottom-up proteomics LC–MS approach generally involves protease digestion and denaturation using trypsin as a protease, urea to denature the tertiary structure, and iodoacetamide to modify the cysteine residues. After digestion, LC–MS is used for peptide mass fingerprinting, or LC–MS/MS (tandem MS) is used to derive the sequences of individual peptides. LC–MS/MS is most commonly used for proteomic analysis of complex samples where peptide masses may overlap even with a high-resolution mass spectrometry. Samples of complex biological material, such as human serum, may be analyzed in modern LC–MS/MS systems, which can identify over 1000 proteins. However, this high level of protein identification is possible only after separating the sample by means of SDS-PAGE gel or HPLC-SCX. Recently, LC–MS/MS has been applied to search peptide biomarkers. Examples are the recent discovery and validation of peptide biomarkers for four major bacterial respiratory tract pathogens (Staphylococcus aureus, Moraxella catarrhalis; Haemophilus influenzae and Streptococcus pneumoniae) and the SARS-CoV-2 virus.

LC–MS has emerged as one of the most commonly used techniques in global metabolite profiling of biological tissue such as blood plasma, serum, and urine. LC–MS is also used for the analysis of natural products and the profiling of secondary metabolites in plants. In this regard, MS-based systems are useful to acquire more detailed information about the wide spectrum of compounds from a complex biological samples. LC–nuclear magnetic resonance (NMR) is also used in plant metabolomics, but this technique can only detect and quantify the most abundant metabolites. LC–MS has been useful to advance the field of plant metabolomics, which aims to study the plant system at molecular level providing a non-biased characterization of the plant metabolome in response to its environment. The first application of LC–MS in plant metabolomics was the detection of a wide range of highly polar metabolites, oligosaccharides, amino acids, amino sugars, and sugar nucleotides from Cucurbita maxima phloem tissues. Another example of LC–MS in plant metabolomics is the efficient separation and identification of glucose, sucrose, raffinose, stachyose, and verbascose from leaf extracts of Arabidopsis thaliana.

=== Drug development ===
LC–MS is frequently used in drug development because it allows quick molecular weight confirmation and structure identification. These features speed up the process of generating, testing, and validating a discovery starting from a vast array of products with potential application. LC–MS applications for drug development are highly automated methods used for peptide mapping, glycoprotein mapping, lipidomics, natural products dereplication, bioaffinity screening, in vivo drug screening, metabolic stability screening, metabolite identification, impurity identification, quantitative bioanalysis, and quality control.

== See also ==
- Gas chromatography–mass spectrometry
- Capillary electrophoresis–mass spectrometry
- Ion-mobility spectrometry–mass spectrometry
