= Endoproteinase Lys-C =

Endoproteinase Lys-C is a protease that cleaves proteins on the C-terminal side of lysine residues. This enzyme is naturally found in the bacterium Lysobacter enzymogenes and is commonly used in protein sequencing. Lys-C activity is optimal in the pH range 7.0 - 9.0.

== See also ==
- Trypsin
- Lys-N
