= Thermospray =

Soft ionization source

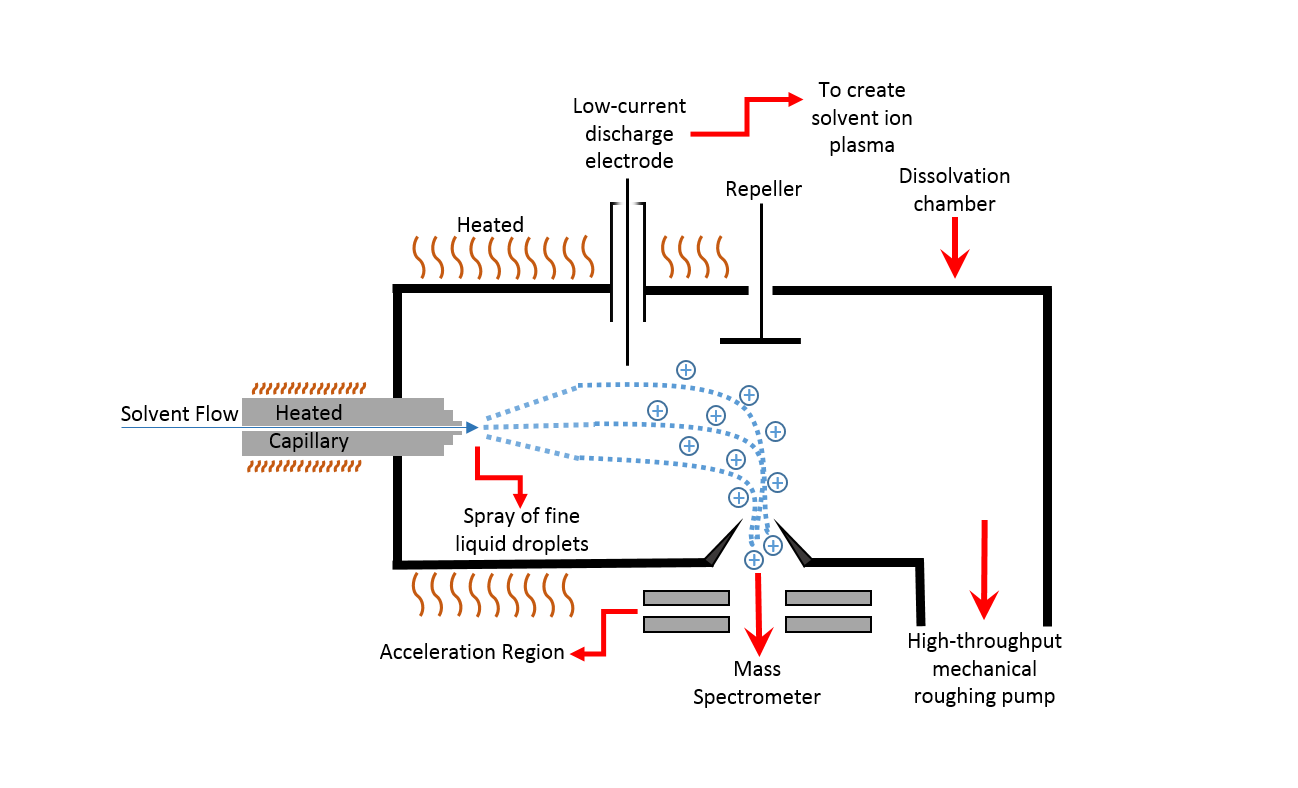
Diagram of thermospray ionization source

Thermospray is a soft ionization source by which a solvent flow of liquid sample passes through a very thin heated column to become a spray of fine liquid droplets. As a form of atmospheric pressure ionization in mass spectrometry these droplets are then ionized via a low-current discharge electrode to create a solvent ion plasma. A repeller then directs these charged particles through the skimmer and acceleration region to introduce the aerosolized sample to a mass spectrometer. It is particularly useful in liquid chromatography-mass spectrometry (LC-MS).

In more technical terms thermospray is the controlled partial vaporization of a liquid as it flows through a heated capillary tube. The nebulization is accomplished by pumping a liquid sample at moderately high pressure through an electrothermally heated capillary tube. When sufficient power is coupled to the flowing sample stream, a partially vaporized mixture is produced consisting of some fraction of vaporized sample and some remaining liquid sample. Upon exiting the heated capillary, the rapidly expanding sample vapor converts the remaining liquid stream to an aerosol. The produced vapor acts as a nebulizing 'gas' and aids the breakup of the liquid stream into droplets, in a process similar to pneumatic nebulization. Thus, conceptually this can be thought of as a pneumatic process where the expanding solvent vapor is used as a nebulizer gas. The solution leaves the tube as a supersonic jet or spray of very small droplets in solvent vapor. Qualitatively, the aerosols appear dense with a moderately narrow particle size distribution.

== History ==
The method of thermospray ionization was first introduced by a patent evidenced as early as 1983, and described in further detail by a patent published on March 8, 1988. Inventors Marvin L. Vestal and Calvin R. Blakley proposed an ion vapor source for mass spectrometry of liquids under a US Grant from the Department of Health, Education, and Welfare. The proposed method detailed a coupling device between liquid chromatographic columns and various methods of detection for gaseous samples; like mass spectrometry, electron capture, atomic adsorption, etc. Four different representations of the thermospray vaporizer were presented in the 1988 patent – UA4730111A. Nonvolatile, ionic, and thermally labile solutes were investigated with the various control systems on the vaporizers to achieve partial vaporization.

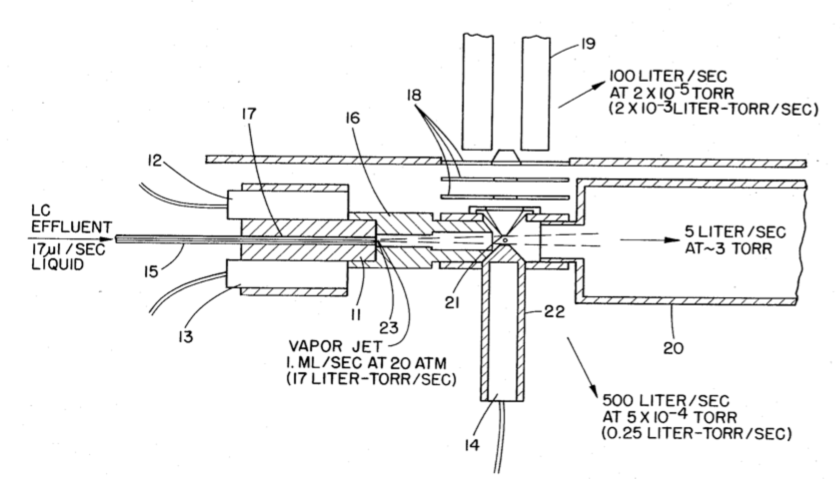
Diagram of first representation of thermospray vaporizer

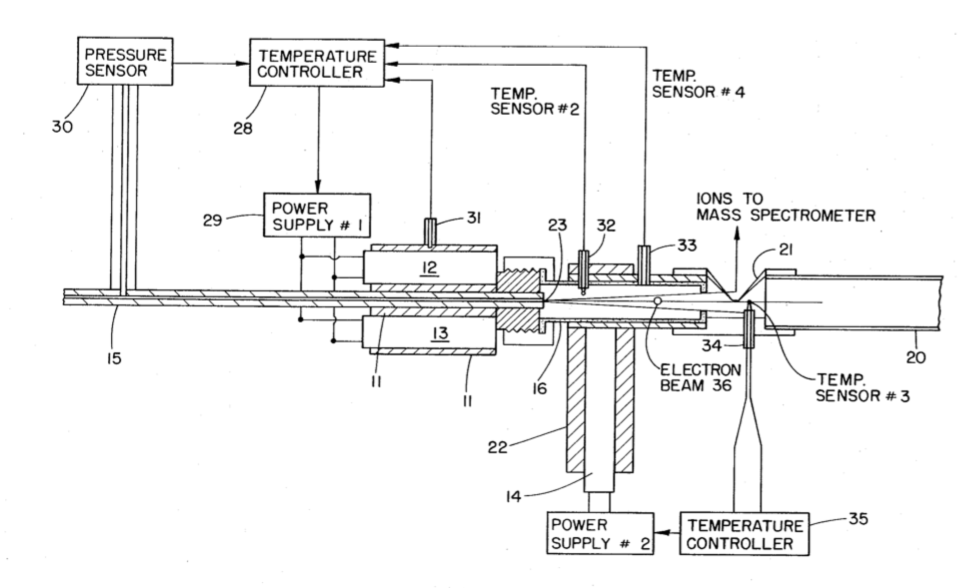
Diagram of second representation of thermospray vaporizer

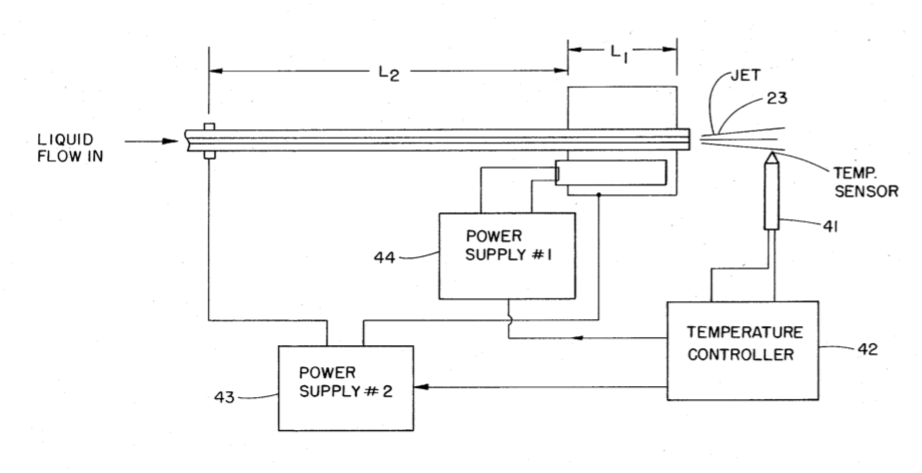
Diagram of third representation of thermospray vaporizer

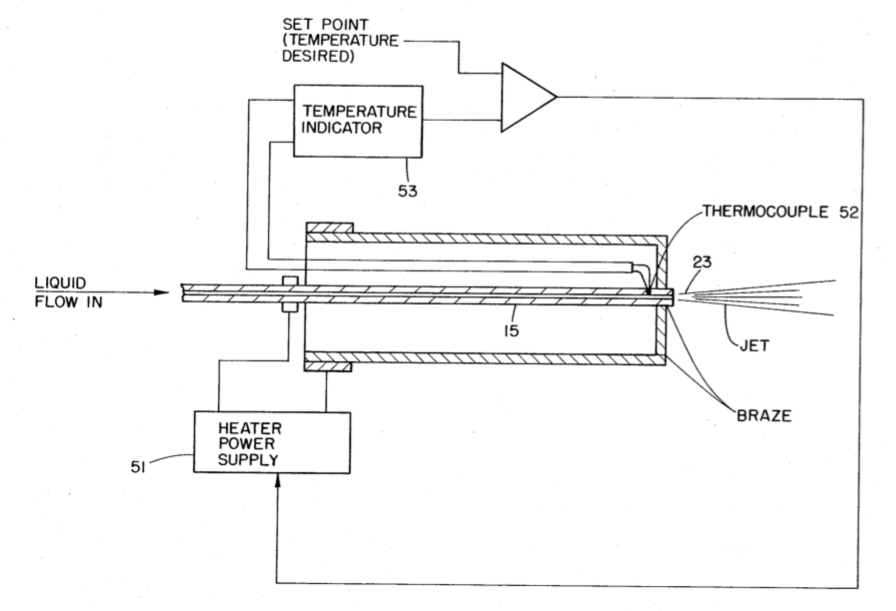
Diagram of fourth representation of thermospray vaporizer

=== First representation ===
A copper vaporizer block is electrically heated with two 100 watt cartridge heaters and a stainless steel capillary allow introduction of sample and consequent partial vaporization. The capillary and the vaporizer block are soldered together to ensure stable thermal contact. The resultant supersonic jet then passes through the ion source for introduction into the quadrupole mass spectrometer.

=== Second representation ===
The construction of the second representation is fundamentally the same as the first; however, temperature and pressure sensors were implemented such that they could control the power to obtain both constant temperature and pressure for ideal operating conditions. This design is ideal for on-line LC-MS with chemical ionization and direct desorption.

=== Third representation ===
Given uncontrolled flow rate or varied solvent composition, another representation was designed such that a different heating source and control system would allow for partial vaporization. Two different heating methods were combined because one is capable of more rapid response time while the other is slower. This combination allows the third representation of vaporizer to handle fluctuations in flow rate coming of the LC column.

=== Fourth representation ===
The fourth version of the thermospray vaporizer heats the capillary tube only by direct DC/AC ohmic (Joule) heating. A thermocouple placed in thermal contact with the exit of the capillary is used to prevent the destructive thermal runaway caused by overheating. This representation was concluded to be the ideal design by the 1988 patent.

== Mass spectrometry applications ==
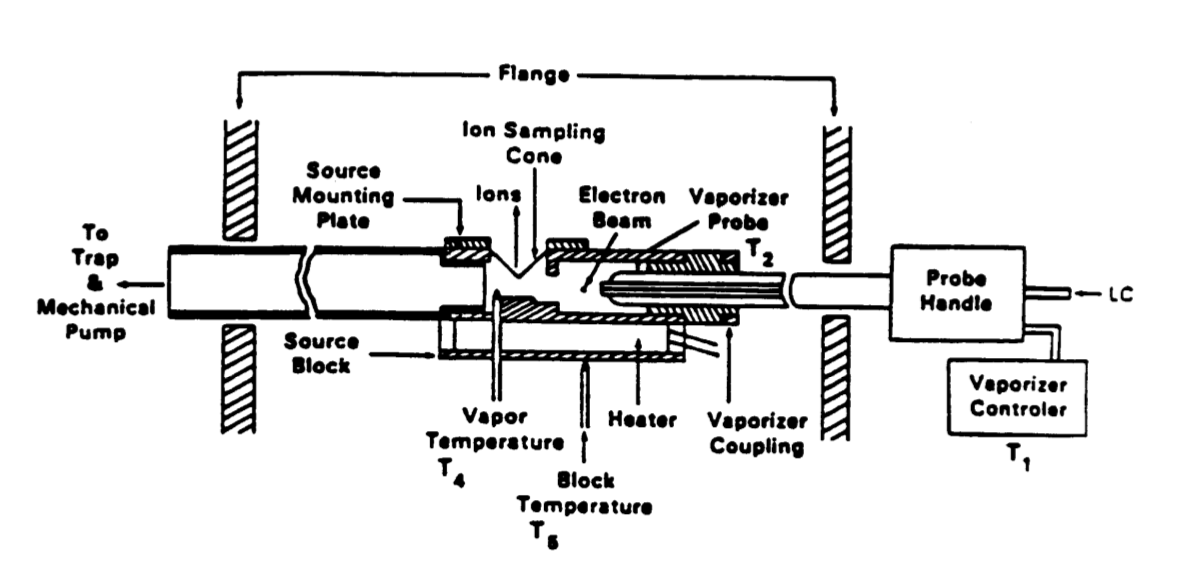
Schematic of the thermospray probe and ion source used in EPA Method 8321B which utilized High Performance Liquid Chromatography-Thermospray-Mass Spectrometry (HPLC-TS-MS).

As a direct sampling technique, thermospray is able to gently ionize various types of analytes such that the resulting spectrum shows few fragments of the molecular ion and accompanying buffer gas components. This lack of fragmentation typically hinders the acquisition of structural information; however, thermospray is still capable of quantitative results and is valued for its range of viable analytes. When thermospray is coupled with high performance liquid chromatography mass spectrometry (TSP-HPLC-MS) the result is a highly sensitive method that is capable of lower detection limits than other HPLC-MS methods.

=== Ionization processes ===
Thermospray ionization has three possible processes by which it can occur. The first involved direct desorption of analyte, where evaporation of the more volatile solvent allows the less volatile liquid sample ions to enter gas phase. The second type of ionization is an acid-base transfer such that solvent ions exchange a proton with ionic components of a buffer. This form of ionization is most commonly used with reverse phase high performance liquid chromatography (RP-HPLC). The third process through which ionization can occur is termed plasmaspray ionization, where electron ionization is applied to the solvent flow under ambient conditions to produce a plasma source. This plasma source then chemically ionizes solvent reagent ions. (Also called filament-on operation.)

=== Viable analytes ===
Various compounds, including peptides, dinucleotides, prostaglandins, diquaternary ammonium salts, pesticides, drugs, dyes, and environmental pollutants can be analyzed using thermospray.

Type	Example	Image
Peptides	Beta-Peptide	
Dinucleotides	Nicotinamide adenine dinucleotide	
Prostaglandins	Prostaglandin	
Diquarternary ammonium salts	Quaternary ammonium cation	
Pesticides	Pesticide	
Drugs	Drug Ibuprofen	
Dyes	Fluorescein	
Environmental pollutants	Dichlorodiphenyltrichloroethane	

== Recent studies ==
Recently thermospray was also utilized for the production of semiconductor nanocrystals, analysis of bile acids, identification of dyes, and molecular weight determinations of proteins from multiply charged ions.

== See also ==
- Atmospheric pressure chemical ionization
- Electrospray
- Sonic spray ionization
- Thermal ionization
