= Lys-N =

Lys-N is a metalloendopeptidase found in the mushroom Grifola frondosa that cleaves proteins on the amino side of lysine residues.

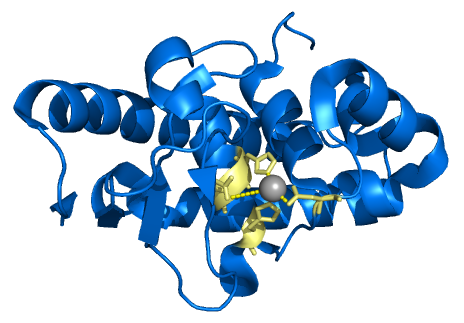
Crystal structure of Lys-N with co-ordinated zinc atom.

== Mass spectrometry ==
Lys-N is becoming a popular protease used for protein digestion in proteomics experiments. The combination Lys-N proteolytic peptides and mass spectrometry sequencing with ETD creates tandem mass spectra composed mostly of amino terminal peptide fragment ions. This fragmentation pattern facilitates the applicability of these spectra for de novo peptide sequencing.

== See also ==
- Endoproteinase Lys-C
- Mass spectrometry
- Tandem mass spectrometry
- Bottom-up proteomics
