= ISOLTRAP experiment =

Particle physics experiment conducted by CERN

Isotope Separator On Line Device (ISOLDE)
List of ISOLDE experimental setups
- COLLAPS, CRIS, EC-SLI, IDS, ISS, ISOLTRAP, LUCRECIA, Miniball, MIRACLS, SEC, VITO, WISArD

Other facilities
- MEDICIS: Medical Isotopes Collected from ISOLDE
- 508: Solid State Physics Laboratory

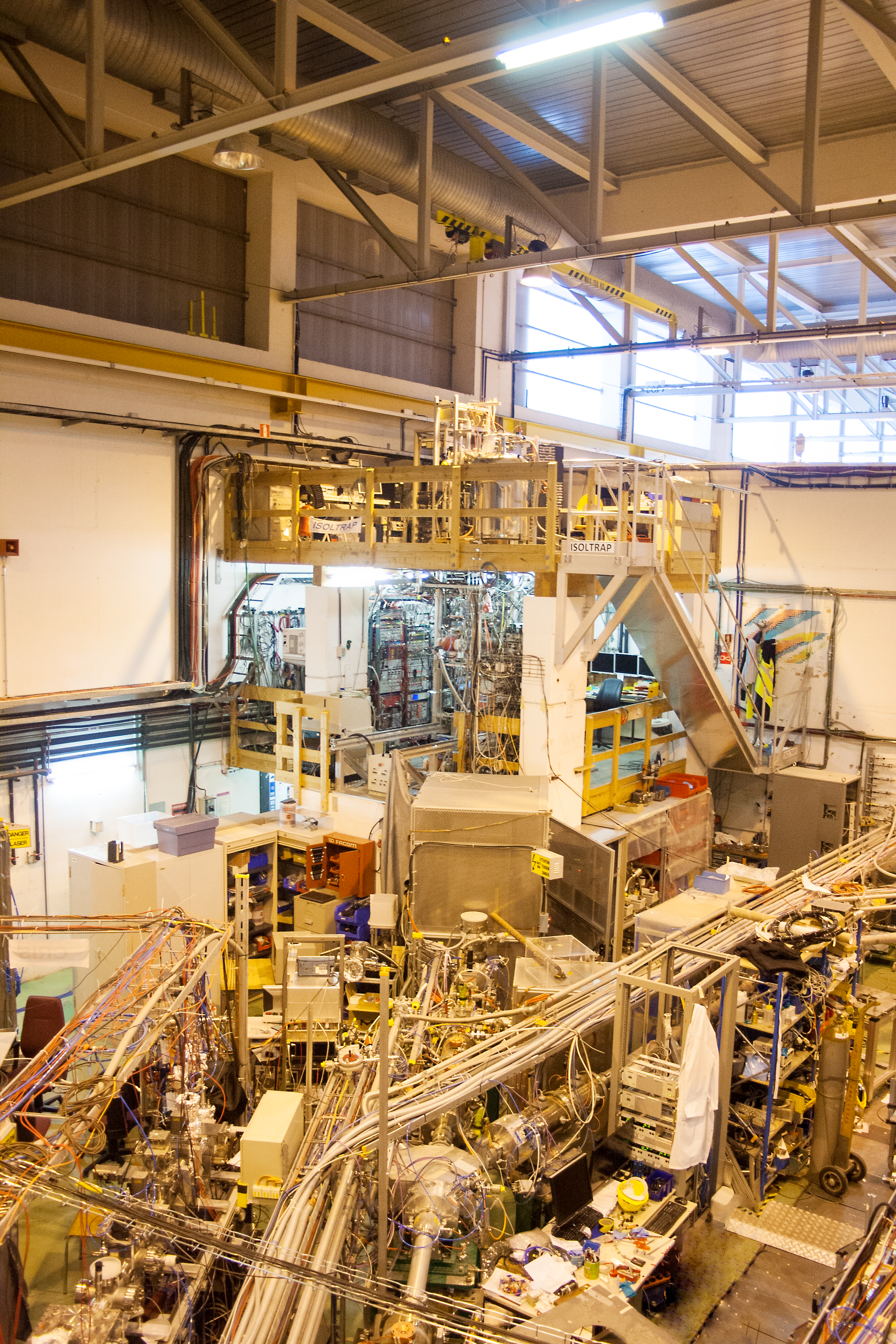
ISOLTRAP experiment in the ISOLDE facility at CERN

The high-precision mass spectrometer ISOLTRAP experiment is a permanent experimental setup located at the ISOLDE facility at CERN. The purpose of the experiment is to make precision mass measurements using the time-of-flight (ToF) detection technique. Studying nuclides and probing nuclear structure gives insight into various areas of physics, including astrophysics.

== Background ==
Mass spectrometry is a technique to determine the mass-to-charge ratio of ions. For a radioactive ion beam, there may be many radionuclides present within the beam and mass separation is needed to isolate a specific ion for measurements.

An ion trap uses electric and magnetic fields to capture charged particles in a system. There are multiple types of ion traps using various mechanisms, including the Penning trap. A Penning trap uses a uniform magnetic field and a quadrupole electric field to confine the particle radially and axially respectively.

== Experimental setup ==
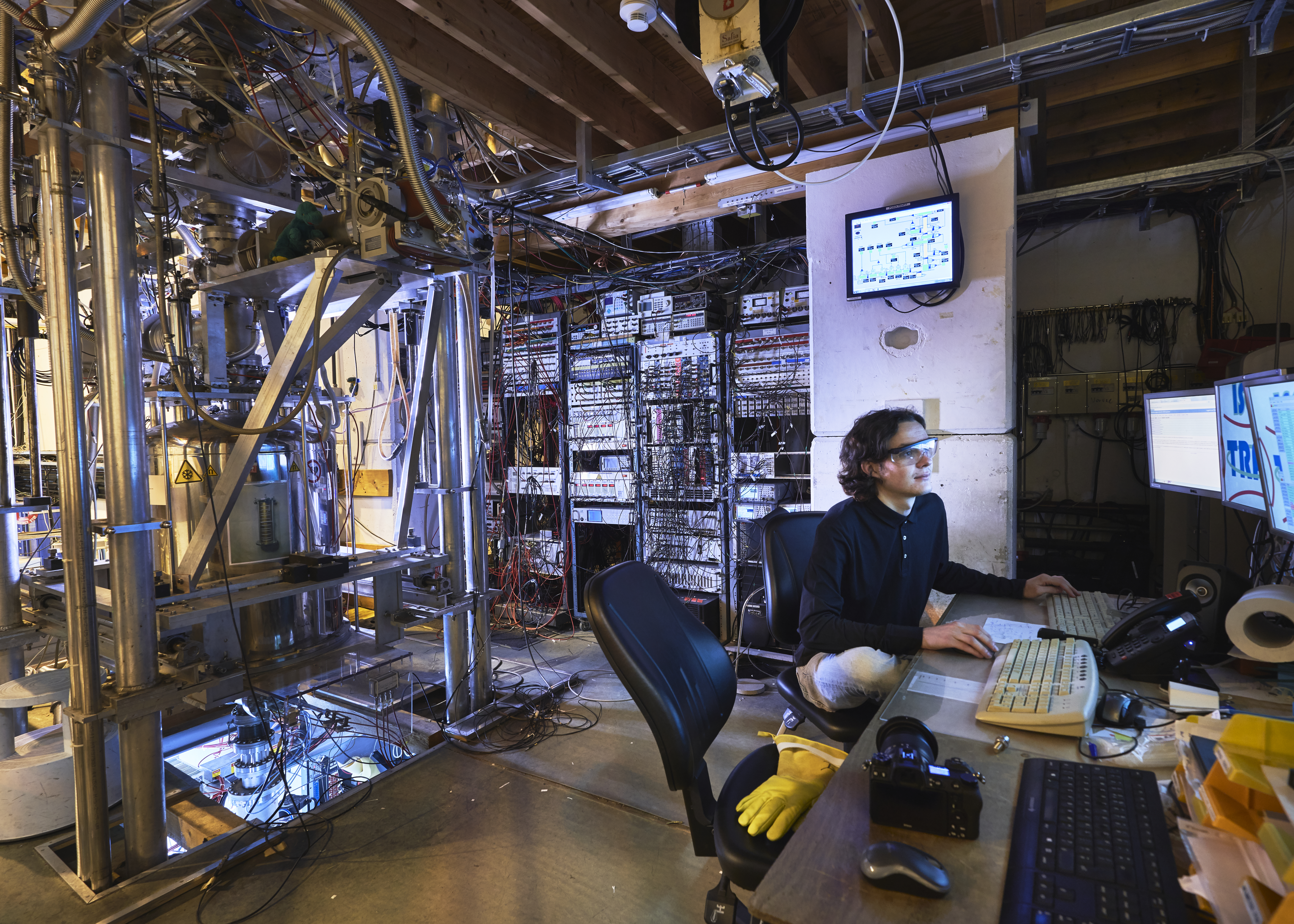
ISOLTRAP experimental setup area at ISOLDE

The ISOLTRAP experiment is a high-precision mass spectrometer/separator, consisting of four ion traps. These include a radio-frequency quadrupole (RFQ) trap, a multi-reflection time-of-flight (MR-ToF) mass spectrometer, and two Penning traps.

The RFQ trap is used convert the radioactive ion beam delivered by the ISOLDE facility into low-energy ion pulses, before it is injected into the MR-ToF mass spectrometer. It does this by electrostatically decelerating the ions and then passing them through a buffer-gas-filled environment. The radio-frequency creates an oscillating electric field which confines the ions to a thin line. The ions are guided towards the trapping region by a potential, where they interact with the buffer gas and the energy spread of ions is reduced. This forms a small cloud of ions which is then ejected as a bunch out of the trapping region and transported to the MR-ToF.

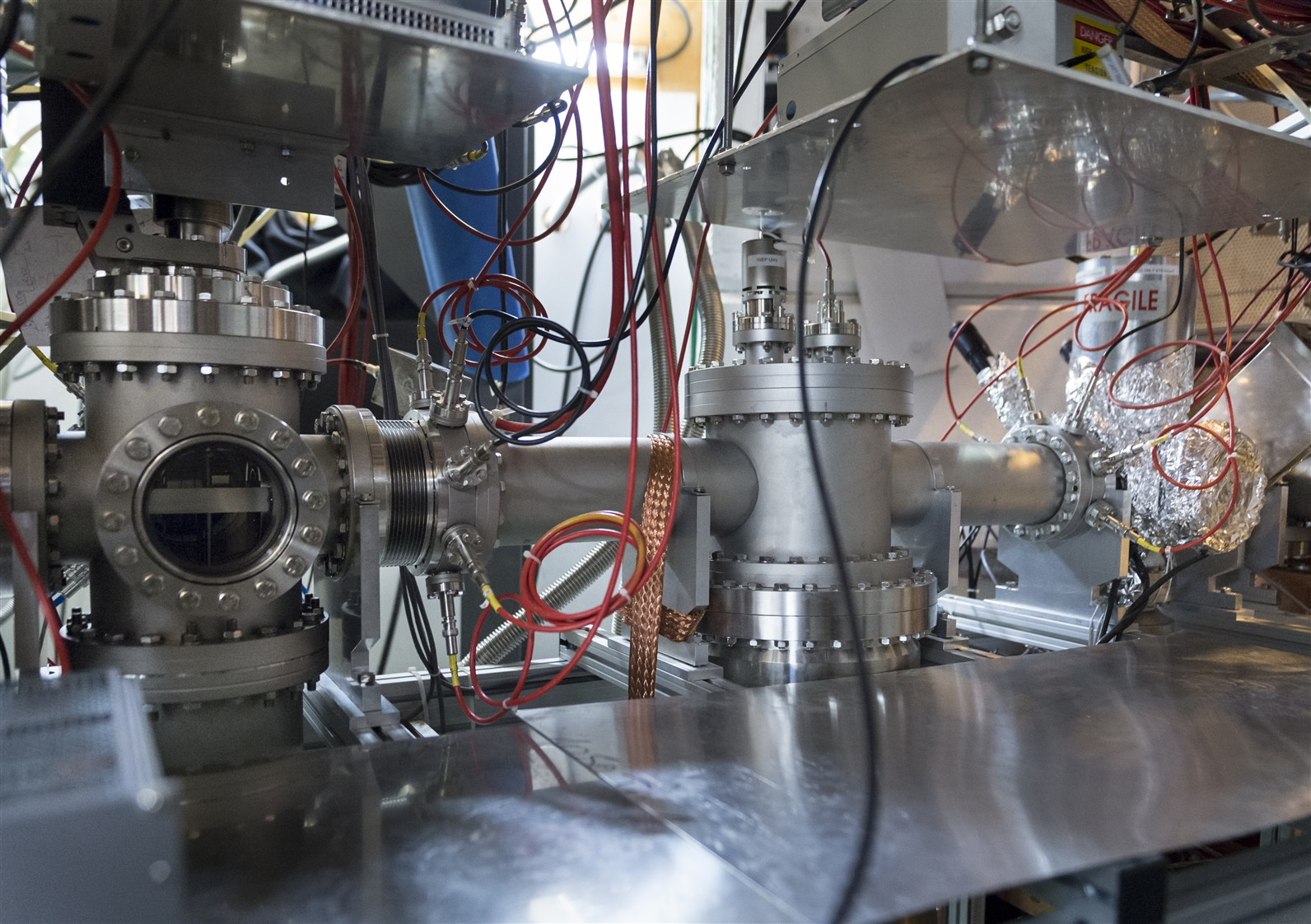
Ion detector (left) and MR-ToF mass spectrometer (right)

The MR-ToF mass spectrometer/separator injects and ejects ions, using a switched cavity, and reflects them between two electrostatic mirror sets to increase their flight path. This gives a large resolving power for a short trapping time, and therefore efficient isobaric separation can be performed. The ToF of the ion is measured by an electron multiplier particle detector and can be used to determine the corresponding mass.

The two Penning traps following the MR-ToF are the preparation Penning trap and the precision Penning trap. The preparation Penning trap, a large cylindrical trap, is placed in the uniform field of a superconducting magnet. The ions are captured and, with high-selectivity, cooled by mass. Mass measurements are made by the precision Penning trap, which uses a radio frequency field to drive cyclotron motion of the ions. The ions are then ejected from the trap and drift to the non-uniform outside (fringe) field of the magnet to an ion detector. Ions that were at resonance due to the radio frequency field reach the detector faster than the others and the ToF can be determined.

== Results ==
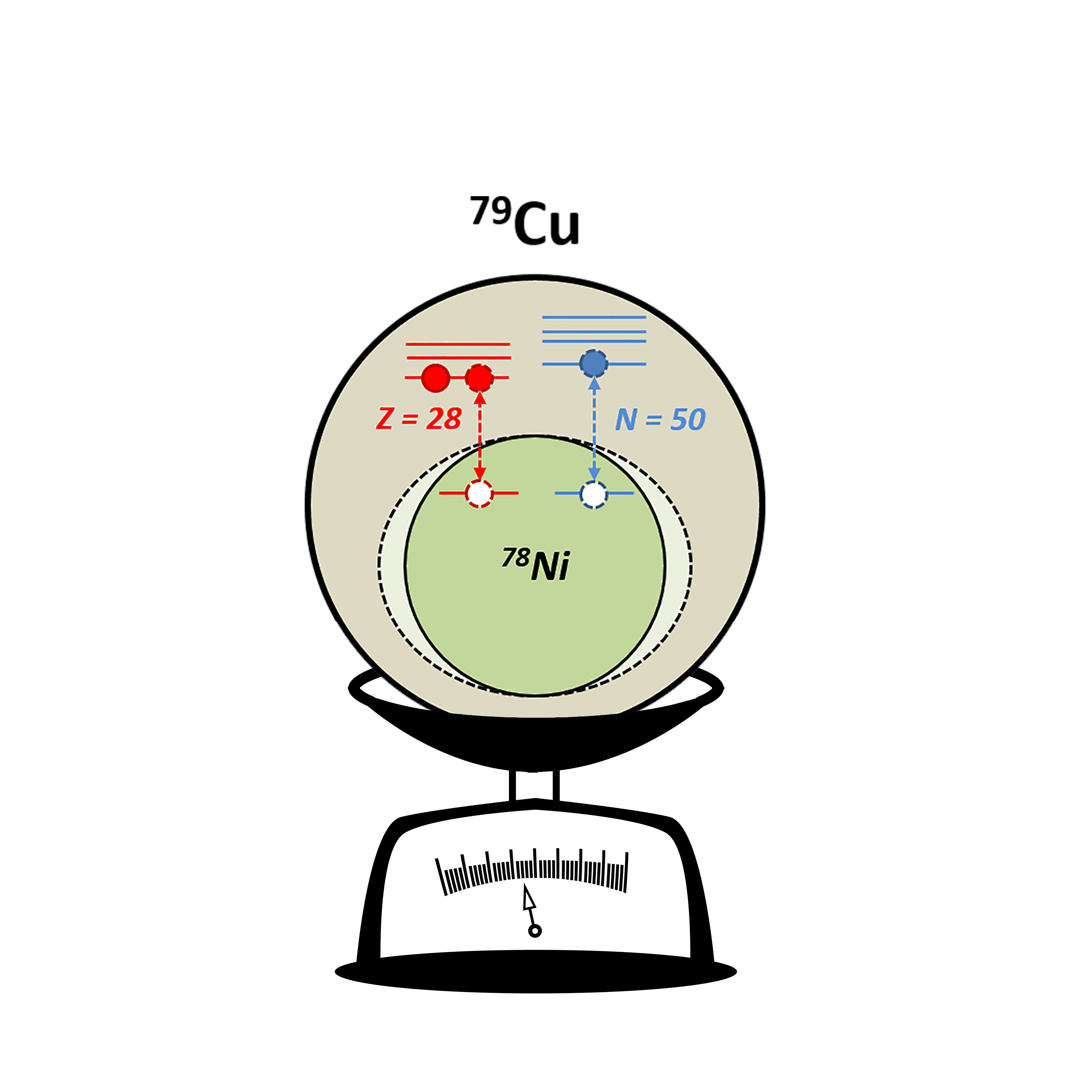
Doubly magic Nickel from one proton away

Since the start of its operation, ISOLTRAP has measured the masses of hundreds of short-lived radioactive nuclei. Initially, the experimental setup consisted of just two Penning traps but since the MR-ToF was installed in 2011, the most exotic nuclides that can be detected are now measured at ISOLTRAP.

One purpose of the ISOLTRAP experimental results is to confirm doubly magic isotopes. Doubly magic isotopes are those that have both numbers of protons and neutrons equal to magic numbers. They are very stable against decay. Results from ISOLTRAP have confirmed that nickel-78 is doubly magic by studying its neighbour, copper-79.
