= MIRACLS experiment =

Isotope Separator On Line Device (ISOLDE)
List of ISOLDE experimental setups
- COLLAPS, CRIS, EC-SLI, IDS, ISS, ISOLTRAP, LUCRECIA, Miniball, MIRACLS, SEC, VITO, WISArD

Other facilities
- MEDICIS: Medical Isotopes Collected from ISOLDE
- 508: Solid State Physics Laboratory

MR-ToF Mirrors of the MIRACLS Experiment

The Multi Ion Reflection Apparatus for Collinear Laser Spectroscopy (MIRACLS) is a permanent experiment setup being constructed at the ISOLDE facility at CERN. The purpose of the experiment is to measure properties of exotic radioisotopes, from precise measurements of their hyperfine structure. MIRACLS will use laser spectroscopy for measurements, aiming to increase the sensitivity of the technique by trapping ion bunches in an ion trap.

== Background ==
Collinear laser spectroscopy is a technique allowing the measurements of properties of nuclei, such as ground state spins, electromagnetic moments and charge radii. The technique uses a narrow radioactive ion beam (RIB) of a specific isotope and overlaps it with a narrow-band, continuous-wave laser beam of specific frequency. The laser is tuned to match the energy difference between the atomic energy levels of interest, which leads to a resonant absorption or emission of photons by the atoms.

Multi-reflection time-of-flight (MR-ToF) instruments reflect an ion bunch between two electrostatic mirrors, so that the flight path of the ion is increased to the orders of kilometres. The device mass separates the ions in addition to increasing their flight path, as different masses will have different times of flight.

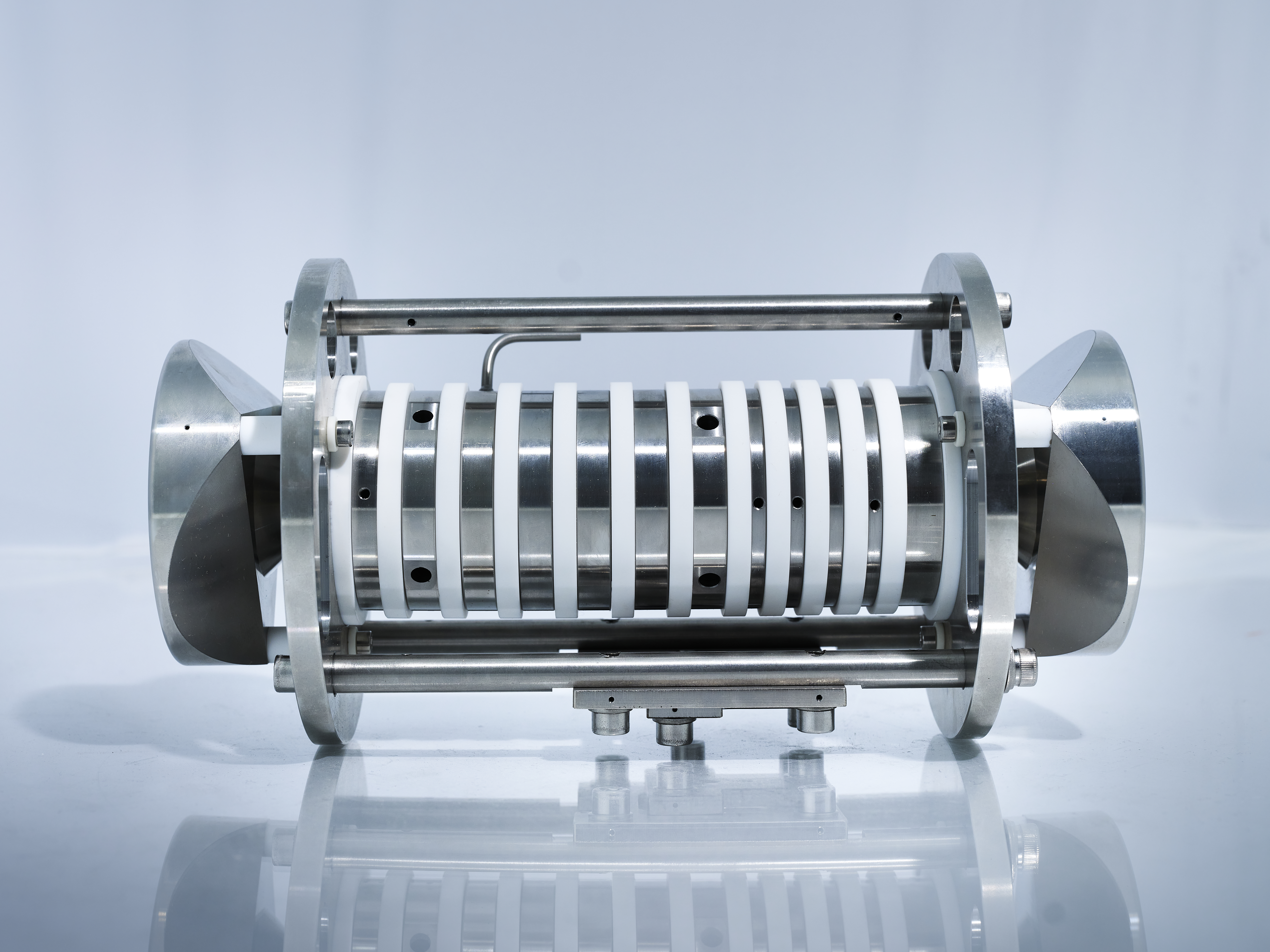
Paul trap for the MIRACLS experiment

A Paul trap, also referred to as a quadrupole ion trap or a radio frequency (RF) trap, is an ion trap that uses dynamic electric fields to trap charged particles. It is not possible to create a configuration of static electricity fields to trap the particles in three dimensions, however it is possible with dynamic electric fields. The confining and anti-confining directions are switched at a rate faster that it takes the particle to escape the trap.

== Experimental setup ==
The MIRACLS proof-of-principle setup consists of an electron-impact ion source providing a continuous, stable magnesium ion beam. The beam is injected into a helium-buffer gas-filled Paul trap which cools and accumulates it into defined ion bunches. The bunches pass an electrostatic quadrupole bender and enter the MR-ToF region where they are decelerated and captured.

The MR-ToF consists of two electrostatic mirrors, which are made of four cylindrical electrodes with electric potential applied. The potentials are set to optimise trapping and focusing, whilst also keeping the central drift region of the device free of fringe (outer magnetic) fields. This region is surrounded by a mesh electrode that controls the electric potential and provides an enhanced photon transparency near the optical detection region (ODR). The ODR consists of an optical lens system and photomultiplier tube (PMT) to detect fluorescence photons emitted by the excited Mg^{+} ions, mounted above the mesh electrode. The system is surrounded by a stray light shield to block out photons not originating from the ions in the ODR.

The narrow-band, continuous-wave laser beam enters the setup through a quartz window, at the first electrostatic quadrupole bender. It is overlapped with the axis of the MR-ToF device, and at resonance with the (Doppler-shifted) optical transition photons are detected in the PMT.

The ion bunches are ejected from the MR-ToF by the in-trap lift mechanism and pass a second electron quadrupole bender. They are then recorded on a multi-channel place detector (MCP) so that they can be monitored.

MIRACLS aims to increase the sensitivity of the fluorescence collinear laser spectroscopy technique, conventionally used for hyperfine measurements (e.g. COLLAPS). It is improved as during every revolution in the MR-ToF the ion bunches pass the ODR and therefore a higher count of photons is recorded.

== Results ==
Currently, the MIRACLS experiment is being designed and constructed, and therefore only simulated and proof-of-concept results exist. Both sets of results demonstrate the potential of MIRACLS, with the prediction that the first measurements will be performed on neutron-rich Mg and Cadmium isotopes.
