= Miniball experiment =

Isotope Separator On Line Device (ISOLDE)
List of ISOLDE experimental setups
- COLLAPS, CRIS, EC-SLI, IDS, ISS, ISOLTRAP, LUCRECIA, Miniball, MIRACLS, SEC, VITO, WISArD

Other facilities
- MEDICIS: Medical Isotopes Collected from ISOLDE
- 508: Solid State Physics Laboratory

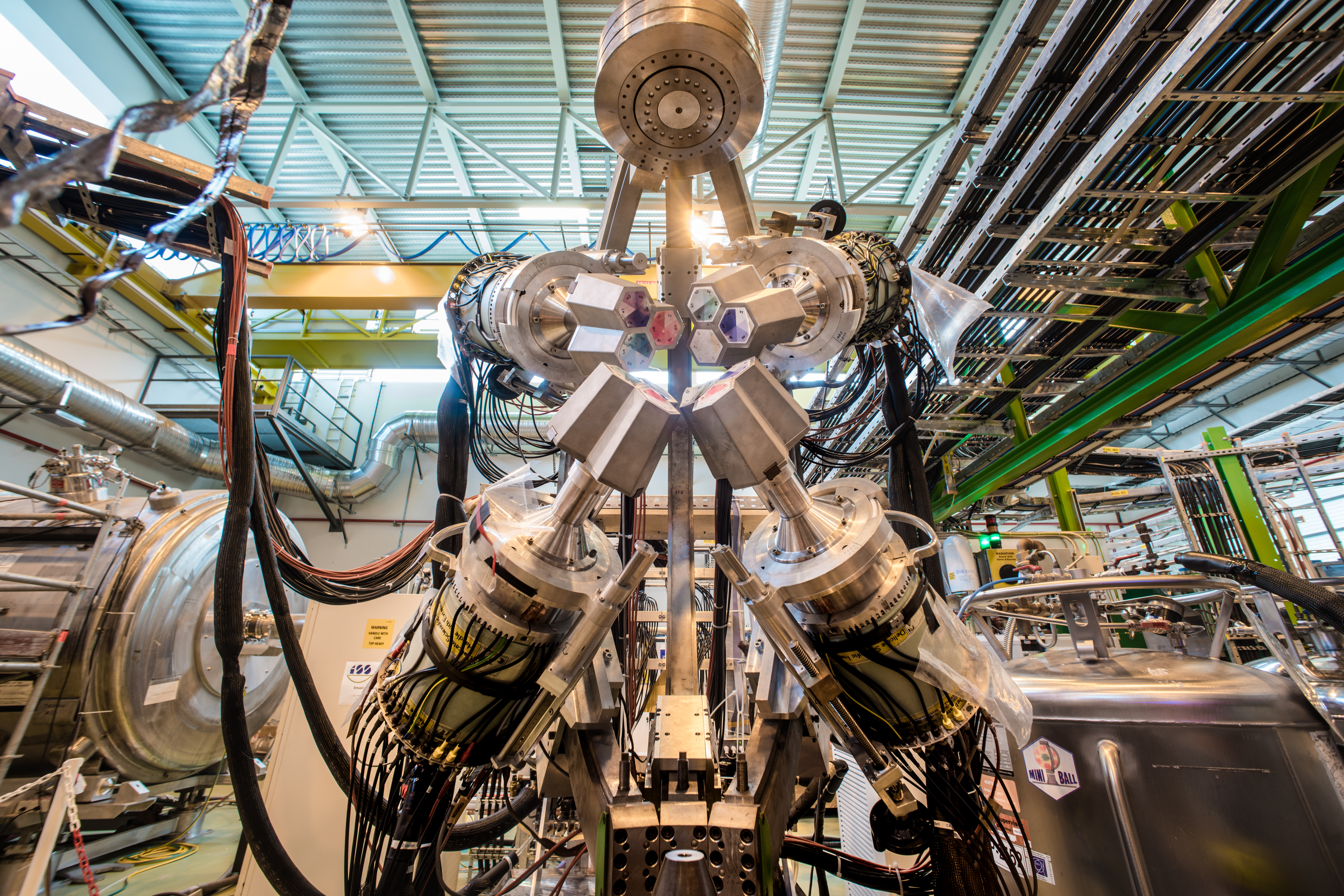
Miniball experimental setup at the ISOLDE facility (CERN)

The Miniball experiment is a gamma-ray spectroscopy setup regularly located in the ISOLDE facility at CERN, along with other locations including GSI, Cologne, PSI and RIKEN (HiCARI). Miniball is a high-resolution germanium detector array, specifically designed to work with low-intensity radioactive ion beams post-accelerated by HIE-ISOLDE (High Intensity and Energy-ISOLDE), to analyse gamma radiation emitted by short-lived nuclei. Due to six-fold detector segmentation, Miniball offers a superior Doppler-correction capability with respect to conventional gamma-ray spectrometers using unsegmented detectors. The array has been used for successful Coulomb-excitation and transfer-reaction experiments with exotic beams. Results from Miniball experiments have been used to determine and probe nuclear structure.

Miniball has been operational at the REX-ISOLDE (Radioactive ion beam EXperiment-ISOLDE) post accelerator at CERN since 2001. In 2015, it became part of the HIE-ISOLDE project, connected via the XT01 beamline. It was the first fully operational germanium gamma-ray spectrometer capable of determining spatial coordinates of the gamma-ray interaction points within the detector volume using pulse shape analysis.

== Background ==
The main two reaction mechanisms used in experiments with the Miniball setup at ISOLDE are Coulomb excitation and transfer reactions (mostly one- and two-neutron transfer).

Coulomb excitation is a technique used to probe the electromagnetic (EM) aspect of nuclear structure. A nucleus is excited by an inelastic collision with another nucleus; to ensure that there is no contribution to the excitation process from the short-range nuclear force, a sufficiently large distance of closest approach of the colliding nuclei is required. The nucleus then decays to a lower state, emitting a gamma ray which can be detected using gamma-ray detectors. This method is useful for investigating collectivity in nuclei (motions of individual nucleons are correlated), as collective excitations are often connected by electric quadrupole transitions.

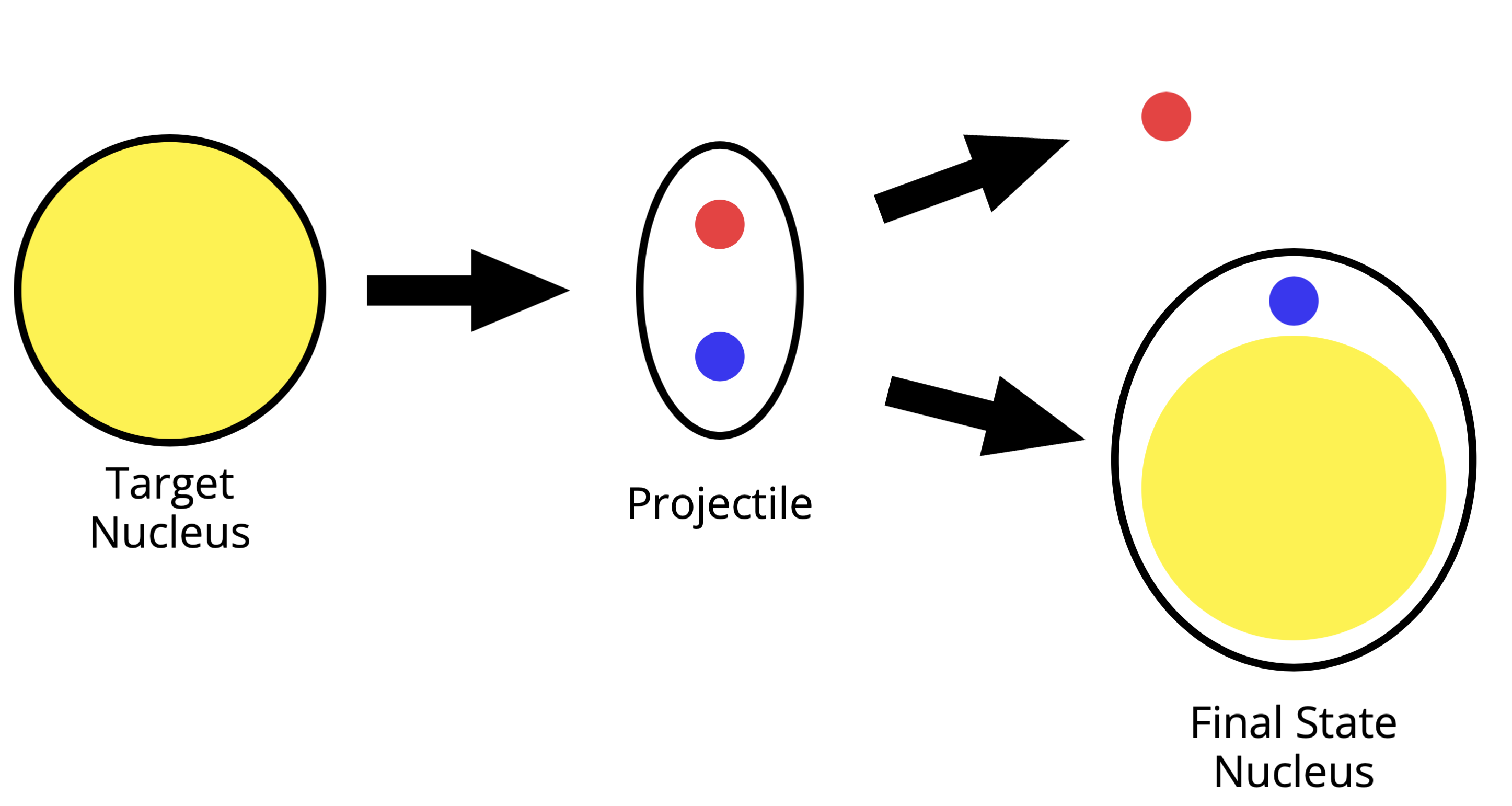
Transfer reaction of projectile and target nucleus

During transfer reactions, one (or more) nucleons are exchanged between the target nucleus and the projectile, resulting in a different final state nucleus. Measurements of the emission angle and energy for use in two-body kinematic calculations can give the excitation energy of the populated states in the final state nucleus. Additionally, the measured angular distributions are compared to theory to deduce the transferred orbital angular momentum in the reaction. For single-nucleon transfer, this indicates the orbital that the nucleon has been transferred into. Studying transfer reactions is useful in nuclear astrophysics as it replicates stellar evolution and can test theoretical models.

== Experimental setup ==
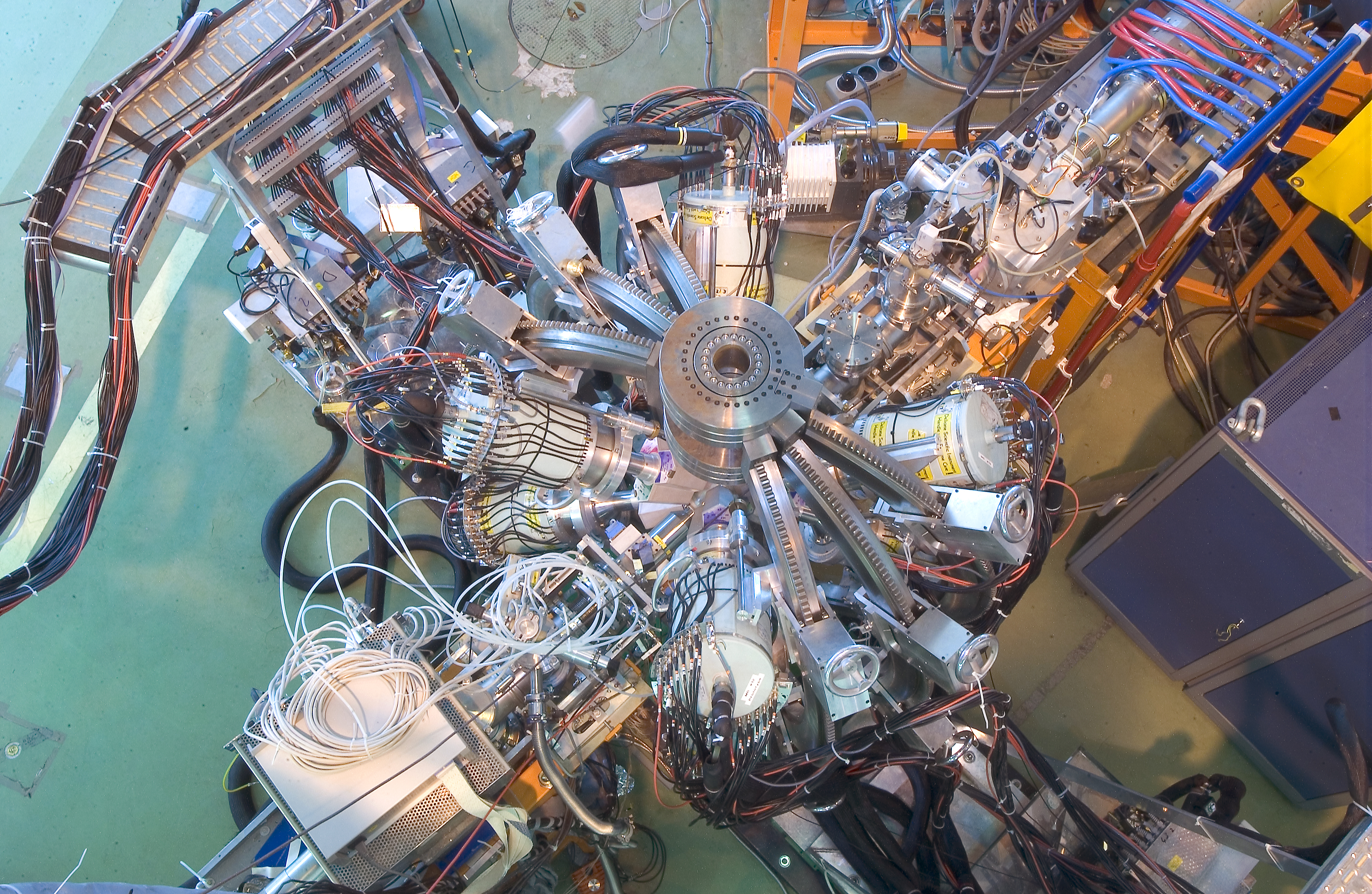
Overhead view of the Miniball set up

The Miniball detector array consists of 24 high-purity germanium crystals which have a tapered front end. In contrast to other detectors developed at a similar time (e.g. EUROBALL) they have a six-fold segmentation, with each of the segments coupled to a separate preamplifier. The crystals are sealed in an aluminium can, allowing access of the cold electronics without the use of a cleanroom, as the fragile surface of the germanium crystal is protected by the can.

The encapsulated crystals are six-fold segmented and housed in cryostats that make it possible to cool down the crystals using liquid nitrogen. Each cryostat is shared by three capsules, which are installed in a common vacuum chamber connected to a single dewar. Depending on the dimensions of the reaction chamber placed in the centre of the array, the clusters can be arranged in various configurations to provide optimum solid angle coverage. This is achieved by mounting cryostats on half-circular, rotatable arms with the ability for continuous motion along the arms.

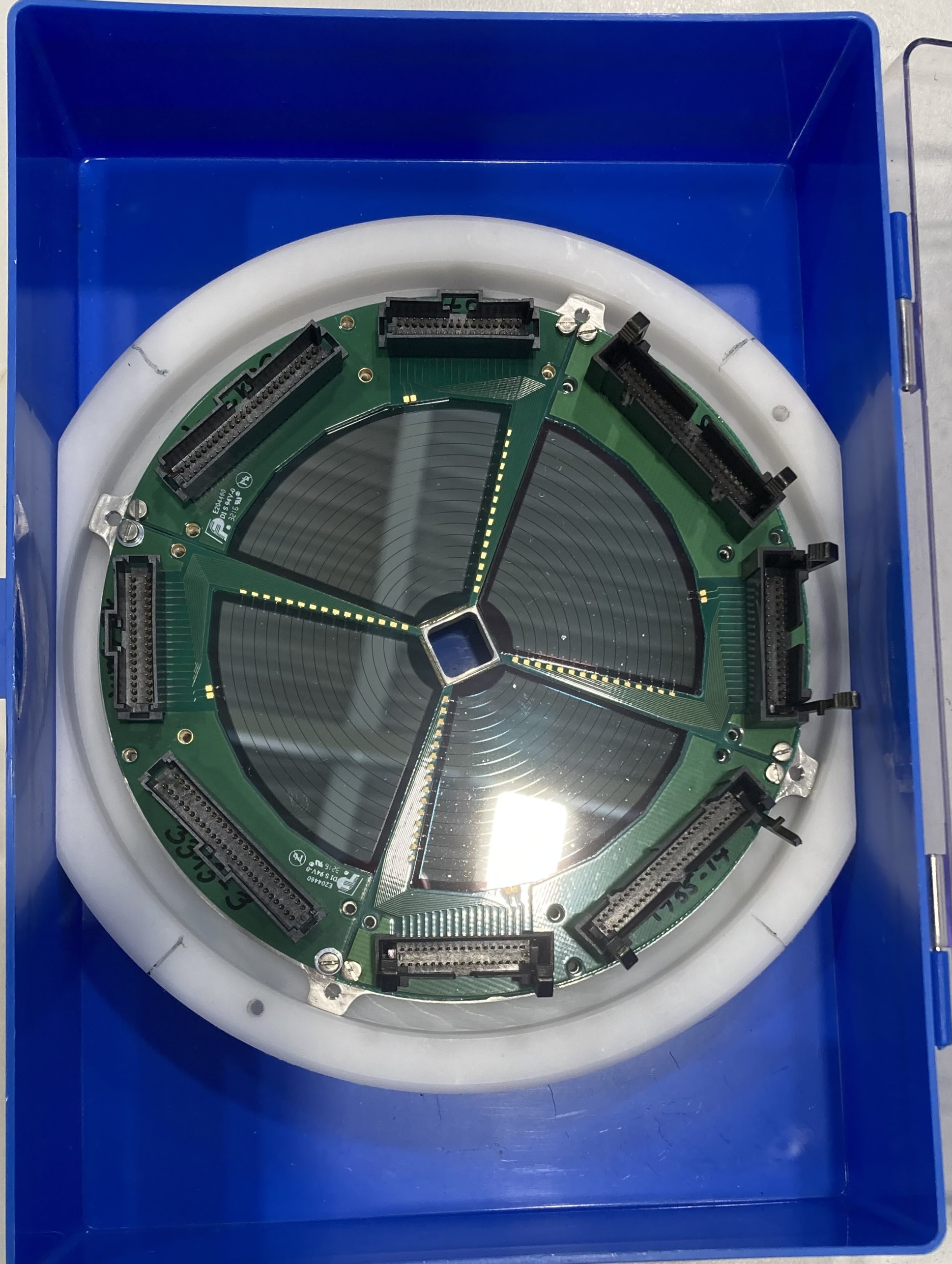
CD detector used at Miniball at CERN

The T-REX (Transfer at REX) setup is designed for measuring transfer reactions at the Miniball detector. The setup consists of a silicon barrel with forward and backward CD detectors, covering a solid angle of 66% of 4π. The T-REX measures the angular distribution of the light reaction products.

Miniball uses digital pulse processing by using real-time digital filter algorithms to produce results for energy and time. The data acquisition and analysis system consists of a front-end system for data readout and transport, and a back-end system for control and data analysis.

== Results ==
A result from the Miniball experiment at ISOLDE was listed among the Institute of Physics (IoP) "top 10 breakthroughs in physics" for 2013. The research found evidence that a heavy nucleus, namely radium-224, has a rigid pear shape. The breakthrough was also featured as the cover of one of the issues of Nature in 2013.

The main experimental technique used with Miniball is low-energy Coulomb excitation. Using this technique, rates of electromagnetic transitions have been determined in many radioactive nuclei . The technique of transfer reactions is also used in Miniball experiments. As an example, in one of the first transfer-reaction experiments performed with Miniball an excited state of spin-parity 0^{+} having a spherical shape has been identified in the "island of inversion" nucleus ^{32}Mg.
