= ISOLDE Decay Station experiment =

Isotope Separator On Line Device (ISOLDE)
List of ISOLDE experimental setups
- COLLAPS, CRIS, EC-SLI, IDS, ISS, ISOLTRAP, LUCRECIA, Miniball, MIRACLS, SEC, VITO, WISArD

Other facilities
- MEDICIS: Medical Isotopes Collected from ISOLDE
- 508: Solid State Physics Laboratory

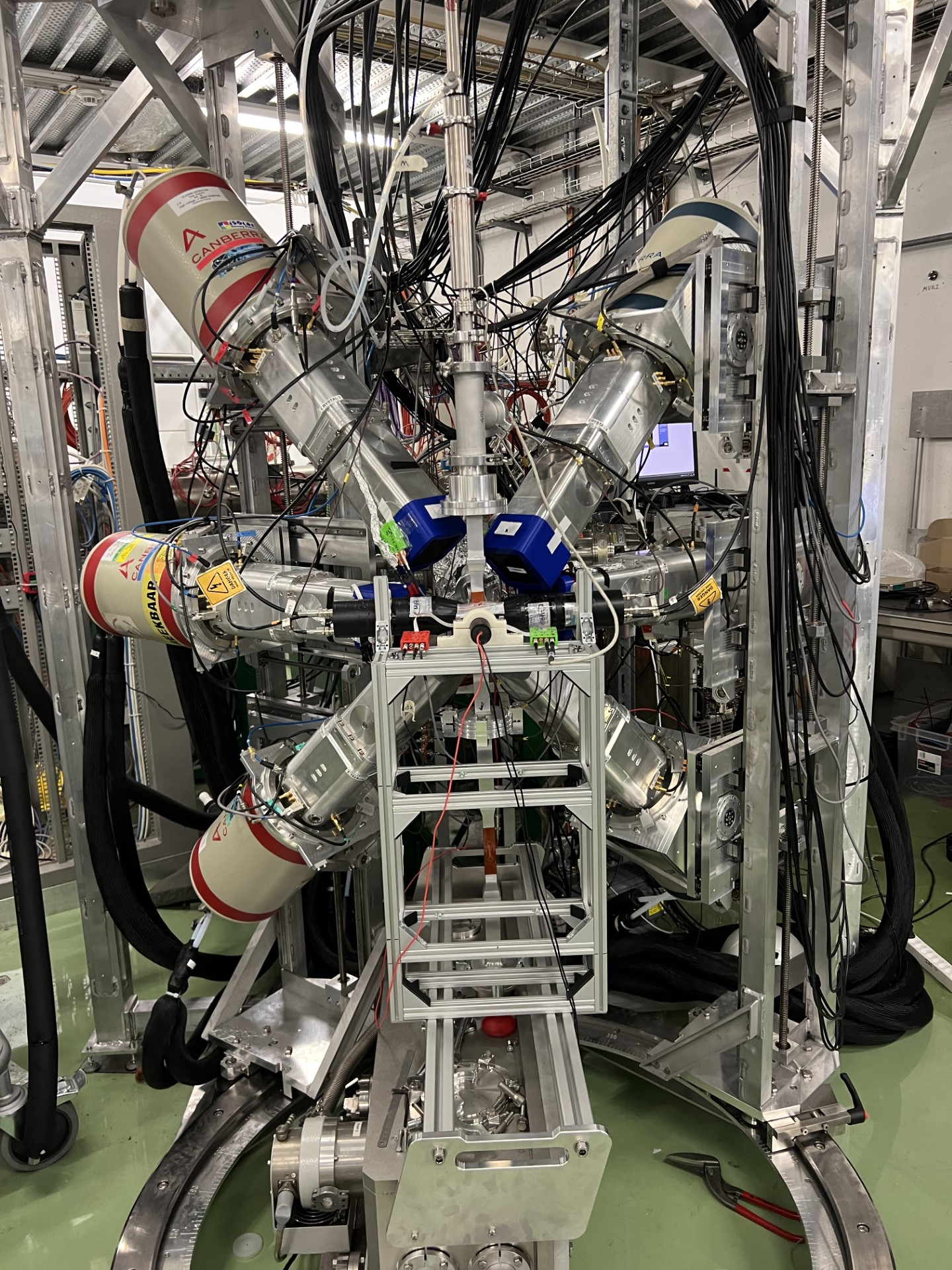
Recently upgraded IDS setup in the ISOLDE facility

The ISOLDE Decay Station (IDS) is a permanent experiment located in the ISOLDE facility at CERN. The purpose of the experiment is to measure decay properties of radioactive isotopes using spectroscopy techniques for a variety of applications, including nuclear engineering and astrophysics. The experimental setup has been operational since 2014.

Experiment systems can be coupled to the station for different decay measurements, using techniques such as fast timing, and time-of-flight. The IDS is able to study a range of nuclei, from light to heavy.

== Background ==
Fast detectors with fast-timing electronics are needed to overcome the short nuclear lifetimes of radioisotopes. This method is known as the fast-timing technique, and is used for sequential decay chains by measuring time differences and delays. The detectors used in this technique must be able to accurately measure the time a particle is detected, leading to a fast response time. Scintillation detectors and photomultiplier tubes (PMTs) are most often employed for this technique.

In charged-particle spectroscopy, detectors are used to determine the position and energy of charged particle, as they create measurable electron-hole pairs when they pass through. As neutrons are not charged particles, to measure their motion, neutron scattering processes must be observed. Time-of-flight detectors can be used to measure the time if takes for a neutron to travel from a sample to the detector, and calculate the neutron's energy. Alternatively, scintillation detectors are also used to determine the neutron's energy, by converting the energy to photons and measuring the intensity of the produced light.

== Experiment setup ==
The RC4 beamline in the ISOLDE facility, which can use the beam from either General Purpose Separator (GPS) or High Resolution Separator (HRS), is connected to the IDS. The ion beam is collimated and, in a vacuum chamber, is implanted on tape, which is moved either manually or automatically depending on the specified implantation time. A movable Faraday cup is located at the entrance and exit of the vacuum chamber.

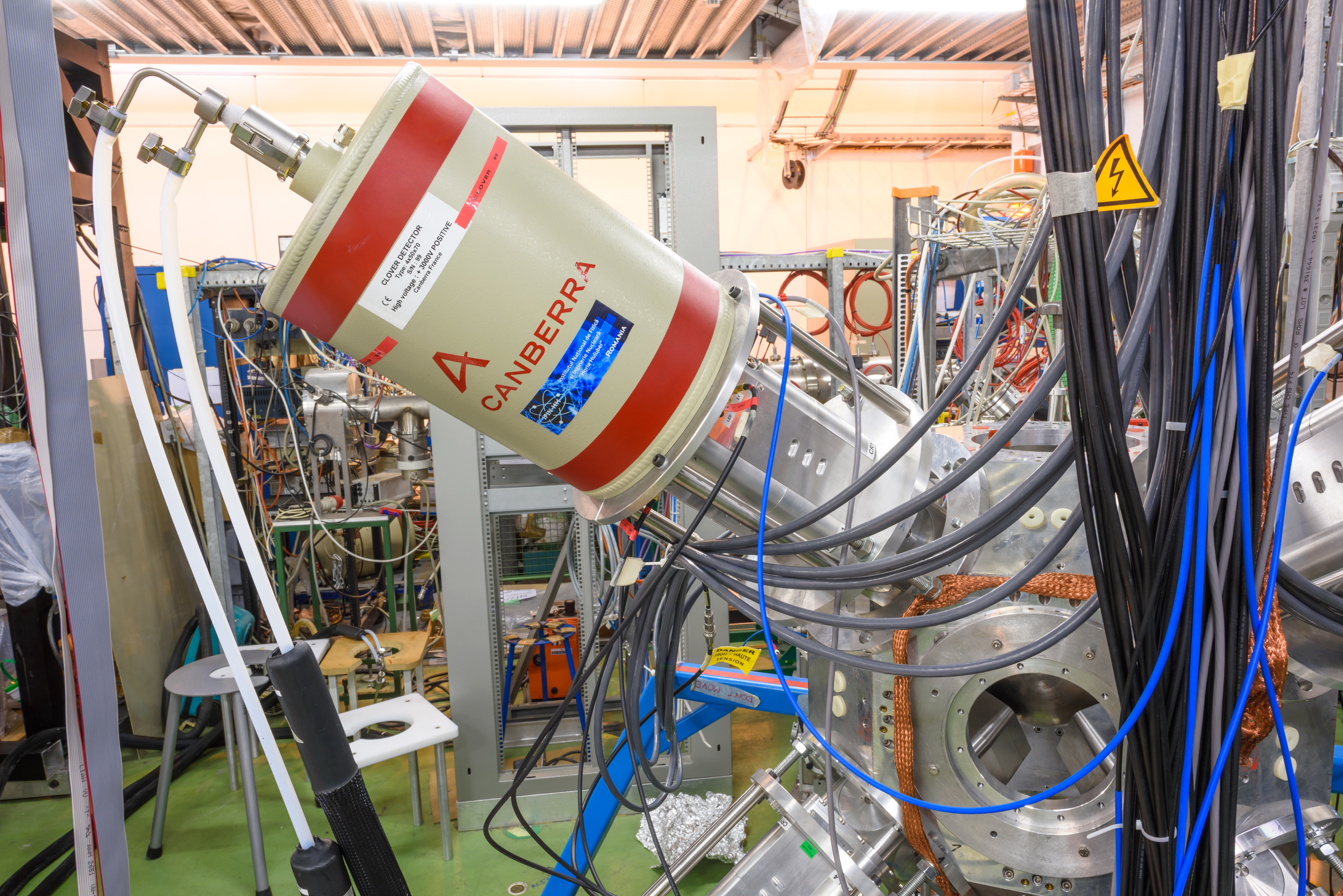
A high-purity germanium (HPGe) detector for the IDS experiment

The base IDS setup consists of four high-purity germanium (HPGe) clover detectors, which can be retracted and inserted manually and one HPGe Miniball cluster detector. These detectors form a gamma detector array with good efficiency and energy resolution. Each detector has a liquid nitrogen cooling canister, and consists of four HPGe crystals. In April 2023, a new support structure was installed at IDS, which allowed up to 15 extra detectors to be mounted at various angles and distances. The Data Acquisition System (DAQ) used to read data from the experiment, consists of a dedicated Xia Pixie-16 DAQ

The specific configurations of the IDS setup correspond to different experimental purposes. These configurations include: high efficiency beta-gamma, fast-timing, charged-particle spectroscopy, and neutron spectroscopy.

=== High-efficiency beta-gamma setup ===
The standard high beta-gamma efficiency configuration of the IDS consists of five HPGe clover detectors, one placed in very close proximity (60 mm) to the implantation point, and the rest slightly further away (75 mm). Signals are induced in a plastic scintillator by beta particles, which are read by two PMTs.

=== Fast-timing setup ===
The standard fast-timing spectroscopy set-up consists of a thin plastic scintillator to measure beta particles, two LaBr_{3}(Ce) detectors, and four HPGe clover detectors. This method has high precision measurements for low-intensity beams and can achieve good efficiency and time resolution.

=== Charged-particle spectroscopy setup ===
The standard IDS charged-particle spectroscopy setup consists of a silicon detector array surrounding the tape onto which the beam is implanted. Around this array, the four HPGe clover detectors are placed, which allows high-efficiency detection of both charged particles and gamma rays.

=== Neutron spectroscopy setup ===
The IDS neutron spectroscopy setup, based on the VANDLE (Versatile Array of Neutron Detectors at Low Energy) detector, is dedicated to detection of neutron time-of-flight. The setup consists of three scintillating detector modules of different sizes, with the scintiliating plastic bars coupled to PMTs.

== Results ==
The results from the IDS permanent experimental setup are useful for multiple areas of physics, in particularly for astrophysics. The experimental data taken by the IDS when measuring the probability of a particular delayed alpha decay, improved upon its previous result. This nuclear reaction is one that occurs in red giant stars, and is related to stellar evolution.

Results from experiments performed using IDS, have also been used to study isotope properties as well as confirm theoretical models.

In 2023, a multiple-particle emission experiment was successful performed at the IDS for the first time. The aim of the analysis for this experiment is to study a specific decay channel that leads to gamma ray de-excitations from excited states of ^{28}Si.
