= ISOLDE Solenoidal Spectrometer experiment =

Isotope Separator On Line Device (ISOLDE)
List of ISOLDE experimental setups
- COLLAPS, CRIS, EC-SLI, IDS, ISS, ISOLTRAP, LUCRECIA, Miniball, MIRACLS, SEC, VITO, WISArD

Other facilities
- MEDICIS: Medical Isotopes Collected from ISOLDE
- 508: Solid State Physics Laboratory

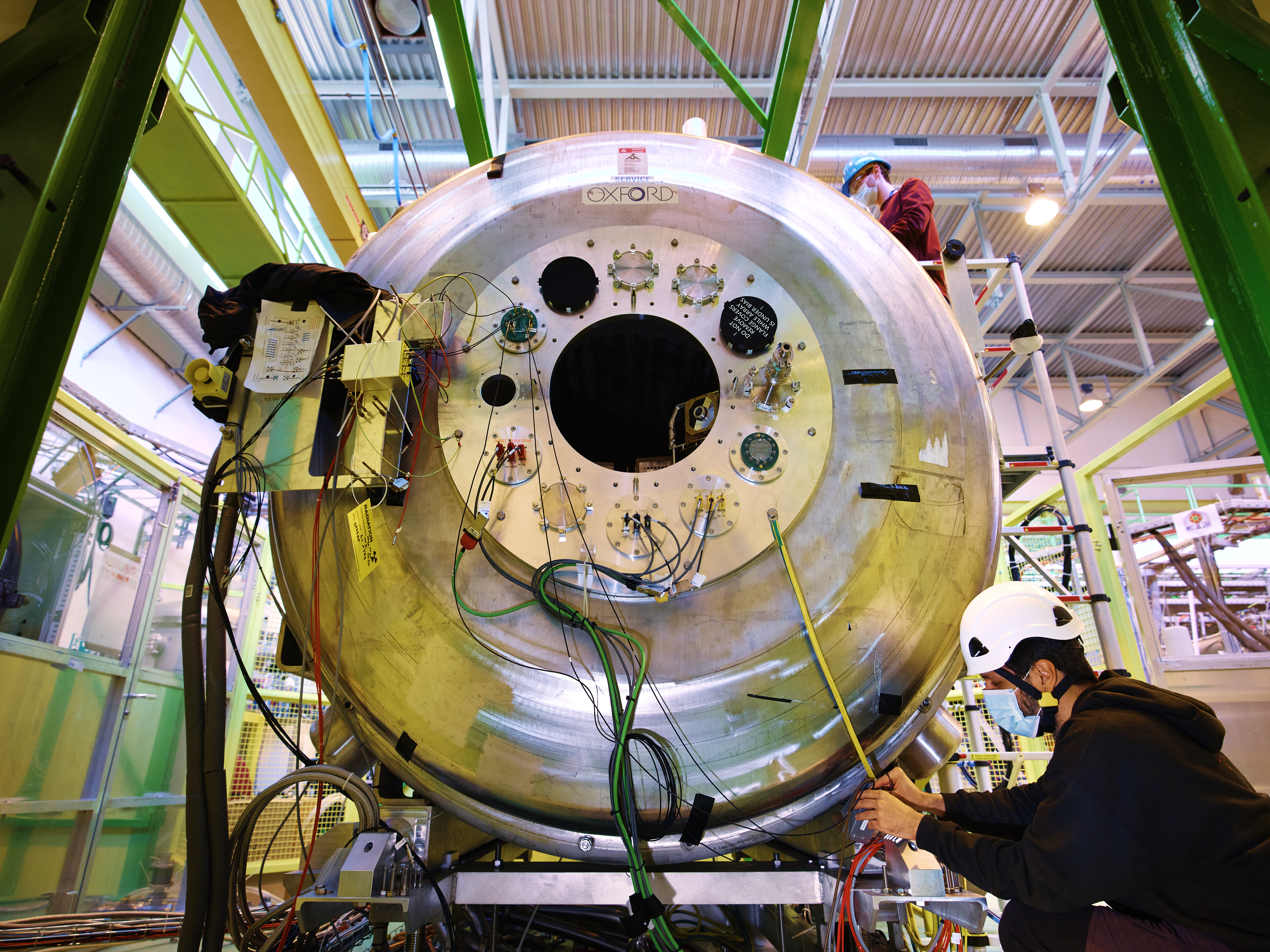
Ex-MRI magnet used for the ISS experiment

The ISOLDE Solenoidal Spectrometer (ISS) experiment is a permanent experimental setup located in the ISOLDE facility at CERN. By using an ex-MRI magnet, heavy radioactive ion beams (RIBs) produced by the HIE-ISOLDE post-accelerator are directed at a light target and the kinematics of the reaction is measured. The purpose of the experiment is to measure properties of atomic nuclei replicating the conditions present in some astrophysical processes, such as the production of chemical elements in stars. The experiment will also produce results that provide a better understanding of nucleon-nucleon interactions in highly-unstable, very radioactive (exotic) nuclei.

The ISS experiment was fully commissioned in 2021 and finished construction during the Long Shutdown 2.

== Background ==
Conventional nuclide production experiments are performed by bombarding target materials with protons or neutrons, and analysing the produced isotopes after irradiation. This limits analysis of the reaction mechanism as short-lived products are not observed due to time delay. An alternate method to this is inverse kinematics, which is based on bombarding a hydrogen target with heavy projectiles. The products and kinematics of these reactions can be detected in-flight by detectors.

The Q-value for a nuclear reaction gives the amount of energy absorbed or released in a reaction. Measurements of this value can be inferred from the energy of the particles emitted in the reaction. From the angular distribution of the yield of the reaction, the excitation energy of the residual nucleus and its angular momentum quantum number can be determined. Due to the inverse kinematics method used, the resolutions of measurements is affected by relativistic effects, especially when the centre-of-mass moves at a high velocity in the laboratory frame.

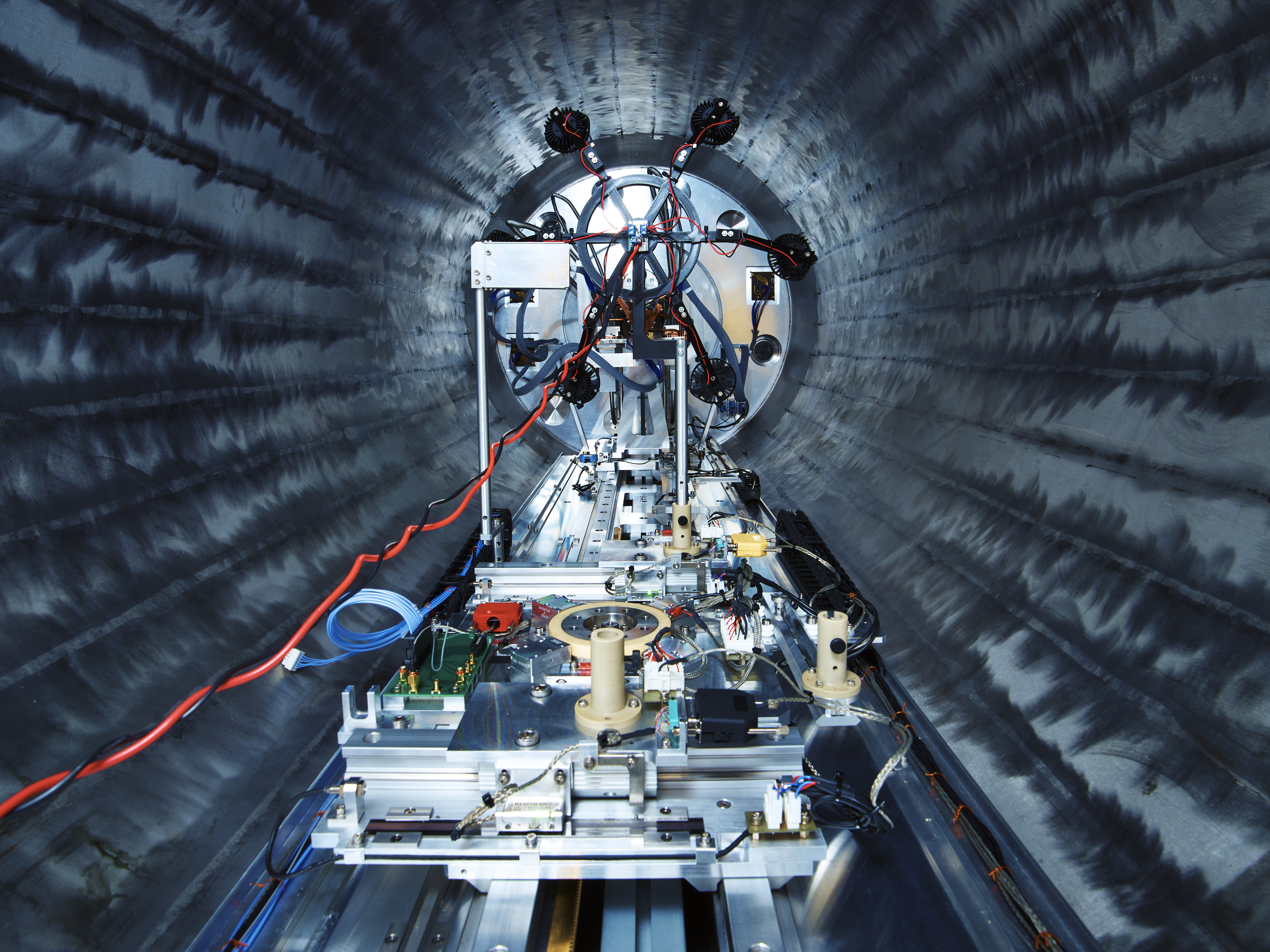
Interior view of the ISS experiment, with the ultraviolet bakeout system in the foreground.

Simple reactions with radioactive beams can be studied using the concept of inverse kinematics with a Helical Orbit Spectrometer (HELIOS). Inside a uniform-field magnetic solenoid, the particles follow helical trajectories after being emitted from a target aligned with the magnetic axis of the magnet. After one orbit, the particles return to the axis and can be detected, which prevents kinematic compression effects. This design works for light charged particles emitted during nuclear reactions.

== Experimental setup ==
The ISOLDE facility produces RIBs by bombarding protons from the Proton Synchrotron Booster (PSB) onto an isotope production target. The beams of interest, chosen by their chemistry and mass, are then ionised and accelerated before being impinged onto a heavy hydrogen target. The ISS is used to measure the kinematics of the reactions.

The ISS consists of a hexagonal tube with silicon sensors placed along the axis of a 4 T solenoid magnet. This configuration is based on that of the HELIOS spectrometer, so that there is no kinematic compression. The magnet was formally used for MRI purposes, and was obtained from the University of Queensland hospital. The full magnetic field strength of the magnetic is currently unable to utilised due to the 2.5 T limits of the ISOLDE facility, although plans are intended to increase the limit.

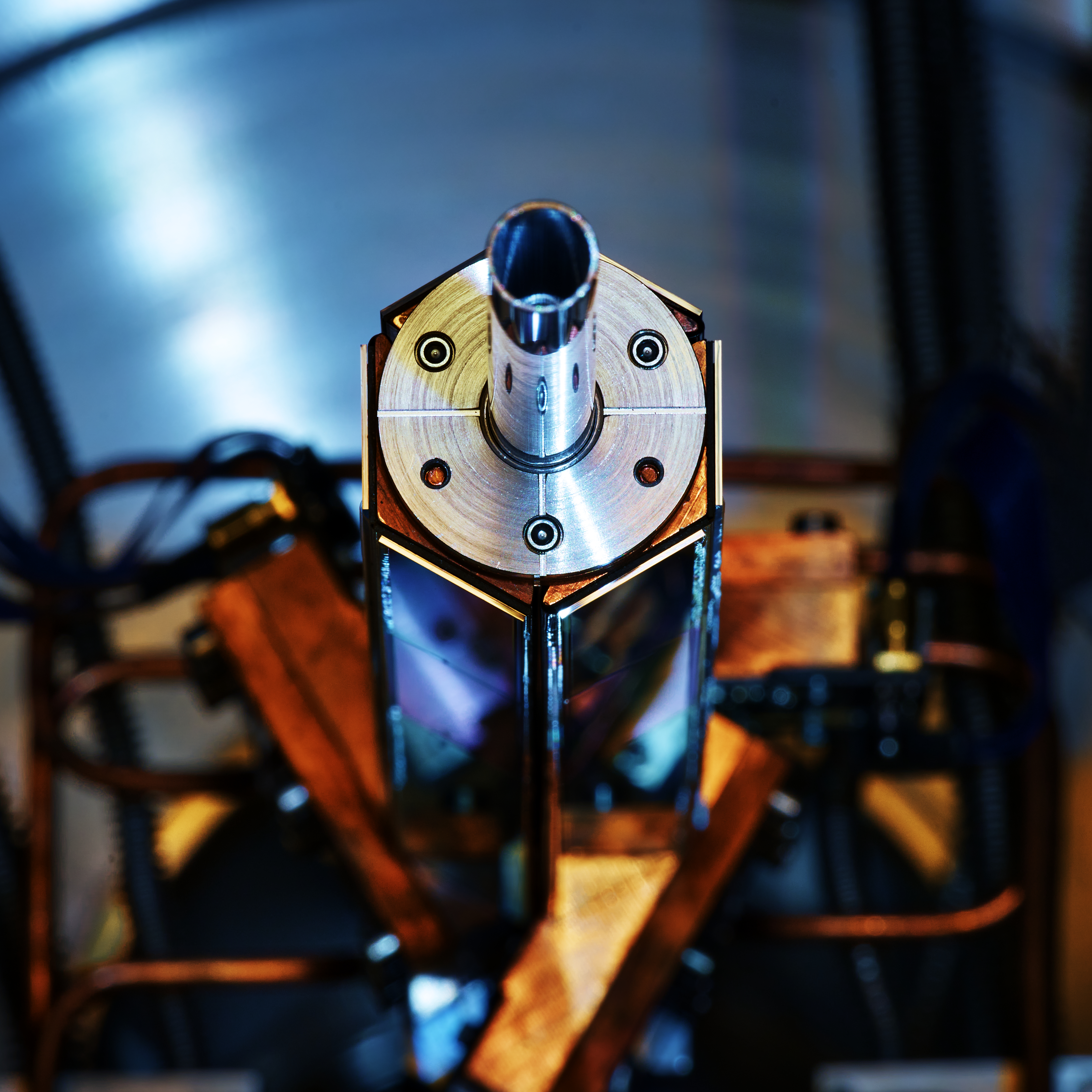
Hexagonal-structured of silicon array for the ISS experiment

The silicon sensors used are 24 double-sided strip detectors, designed to allow Q-value resolutions approaching 20 keV. The hexagonal-structured array is constructed three individual modules each with eight detectors. The array also includes four DSSSD detectors on each side, one side paired across the silicon wafers.

The target used for the reactions studies with weak beams is an active target called SpecMAT. It uses a time-projection chamber (TPC), with its inner volume filled with a specific gas mixture depending on the gas nuclei needed to produce the desired reaction. The TPC is paired with highly-granulated gaseous detector, and a cylindrical electric-field shaper. The SpecMAT collects 3D tracks and kinematics for each reaction event. Around the SpecMAT, an array of scintillation detectors (CeBr3) performs detailed gamma-ray spectroscopy of the nuclear states.

== Results ==
The first results from the ISS experiment, was a study of the neutron structure of 207Hg, a previously unstudied isotope. After analysis, the binding energies of the nuclear orbitals were determined and used to challenge theoretical models.
