= VITO experiment =

Isotope Separator On Line Device (ISOLDE)
List of ISOLDE experimental setups
- COLLAPS, CRIS, EC-SLI, IDS, ISS, ISOLTRAP, LUCRECIA, Miniball, MIRACLS, SEC, VITO, WISArD

Other facilities
- MEDICIS: Medical Isotopes Collected from ISOLDE
- 508: Solid State Physics Laboratory

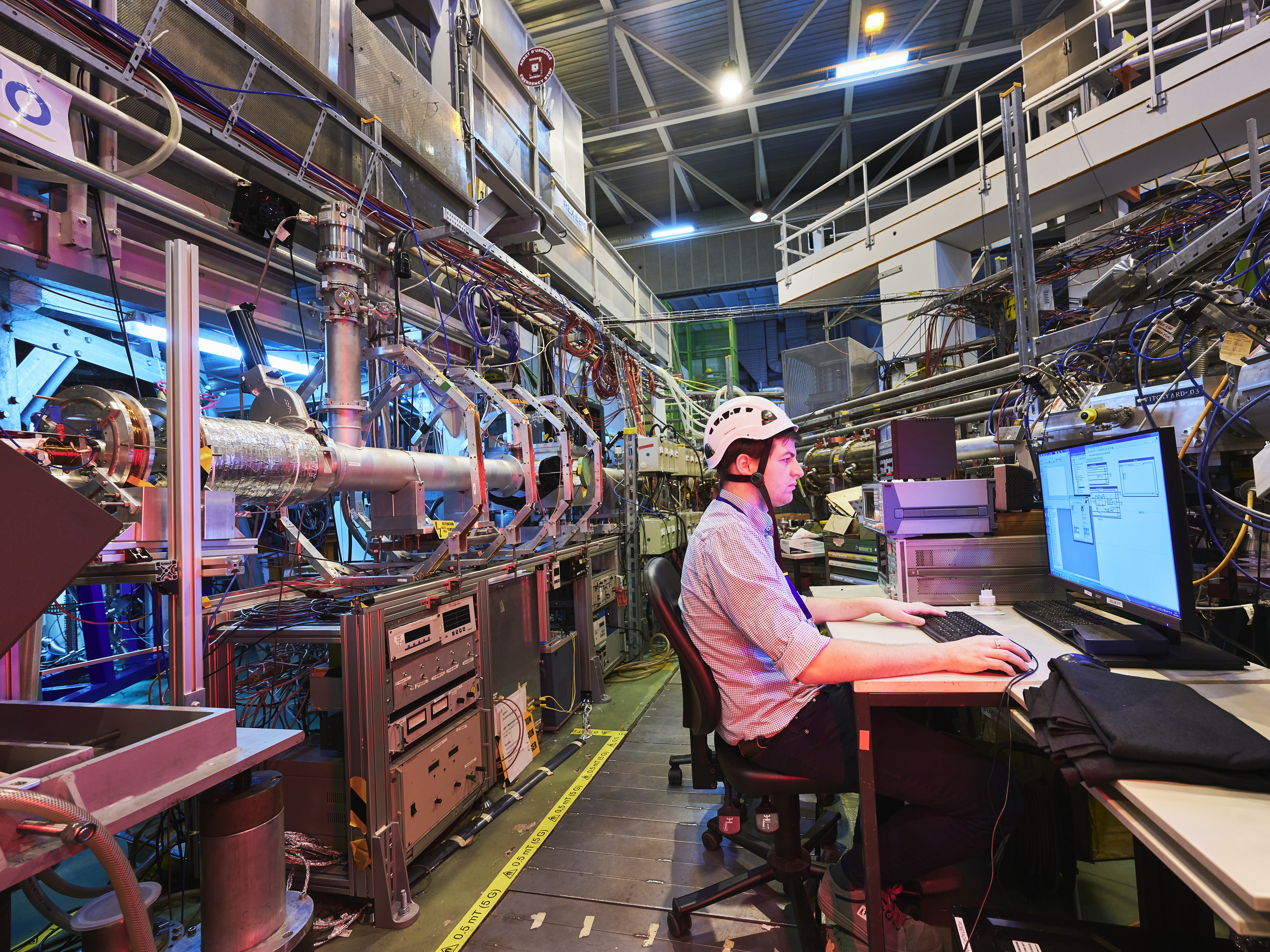
The VITO beamline area in the ISOLDE facility

The Versatile Ion polarisation Technique Online (VITO) experiment is a permanent experimental setup located in the ISOLDE facility at CERN, in the form of a beamline. The purpose of the beamline is to perform a wide range of studies using spin-polarised short-lived atomic nuclei. VITO uses circularly-polarised laser light to obtain polarised radioactive beams of different isotopes delivered by ISOLDE. These have already been used for weak-interaction studies, biological investigations, and more recently nuclear structure research. The beamline is located at the site of the former Ultra High Vacuum (UHV) beamline hosting ASPIC.

== Beamline setup ==
Radioactive ion beams (RIBs) are produced by the ISOLDE facility, using a beam of high-energy protons from the ProtonSynchrotron Booster (PSB) incident on a target. The interaction of the beam and the target produces radioactive species, which are extracted through thermal diffusion by heating the target. The beam of radioactive ions is then separated by mass number by one of the two mass separators at the facility. The resulting low-energy beam is delivered to the various experimental stations.

The VITO beamline is modular. The first part is common for all projects and is devoted to atomic polarisation via optical pumping with circularly polarised laser light. The singly-charged ion beam of short-lived isotopes from ISOLDE (RIB) is Doppler-tuned in resonance with the laser light provided by a continuous-wave tunable laser. Next, the beam may be neutralised, before it reaches a 1.5 m long section in which the ion or atom beam is overlapped with the laser and they interact many times (many excitation-decay cycles take place), leading to the polarisation of the atomic spins.

The polarised beam is then transported to one of the setups that can be placed behind the polarisation line. At this point the polarised beam is implanted into a solid or liquid host. A strong magnetic field surrounding the sample allowing the nuclear spin polarisation to be maintained for dozens of milliseconds to seconds, by decoupling the electron and nuclear spin. In these conditions, the degree of spin polarisation and its changes can be monitored extremely efficiently by observing the spatial asymmetry in the emission of beta particles by the decaying short-lived nuclei. This is possible, because the weak force that is responsible for the beta decay does not conserve parity. As few as several thousands decays might be enough to record a good signal.

== Nuclear Magnetic Resonance (NMR) ==
Nuclear Magnetic Resonance (NMR) is a technique that provides information on the environment of a nucleus, from calculations based on the shift in Larmor frequency or relaxation time. β-NMR is a modification of this basic technique using the idea that beta decay from polarised radioactive nuclei is anisotropic (directional) in space. The resonances are detected as change in the beta-decay asymmetry which gives it a much higher signal strength than conventional NMR (up to 10 orders of magnitude).

== Results ==
One of the first experiments using polarised beams at VITO was devoted polarisation of a mirror-nucleus argon-35. The scientific motivation for this project was provided by the weak interaction studies and the determination of the V_{ud} matrix element in the CKM quark mixing matrix.

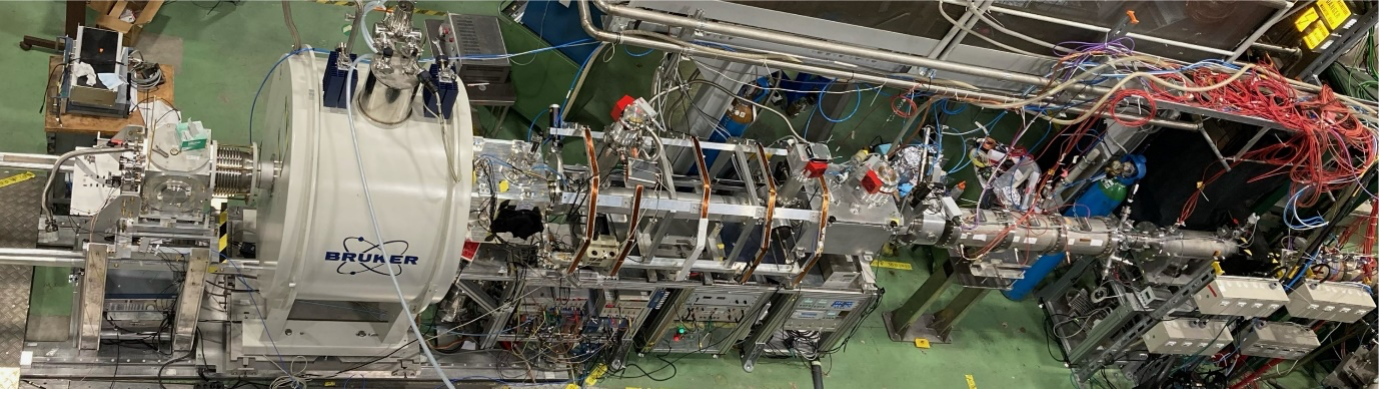
Latest setup for β-NMR at VITO

The next, gradually upgraded, setup is centred around a high-field magnet, liquid samples and radio frequency excitations. The aim is to develop a method of beta-detected Nuclear Magnetic Resonance (β-NMR) to investigate the interaction of metal ions with biomolecules in liquids.

The most recent studies at VITO concern the determination of spins and parities in excited nuclear states, poplulated by beta decay. In this case, the setup consists of a solid sample, surrounded by a compact magnet that allows for gamma radiation and neutrons to reach the decay spectroscopy setup.
