= SEC experiment =

Isotope Separator On Line Device (ISOLDE)
List of ISOLDE experimental setups
- COLLAPS, CRIS, EC-SLI, IDS, ISS, ISOLTRAP, LUCRECIA, Miniball, MIRACLS, SEC, VITO, WISArD

Other facilities
- MEDICIS: Medical Isotopes Collected from ISOLDE
- 508: Solid State Physics Laboratory

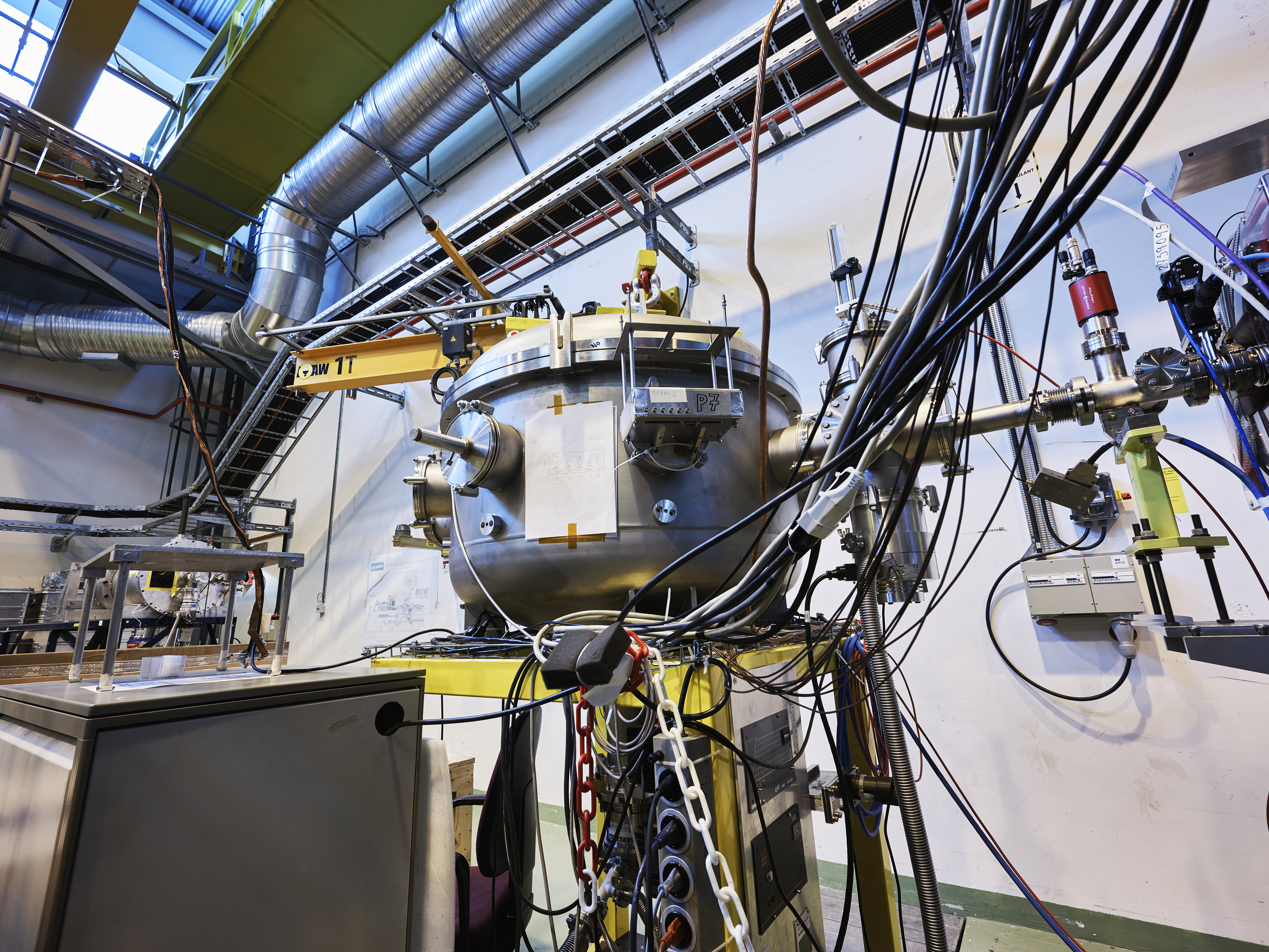
The SEC chamber at CERN

The Scattering Experiments Chamber (SEC) experiment is a permanent experimental setup located in the ISOLDE facility at CERN. The station facilitates diversified reaction experiments, especially for studying low-lying resonances in light atomic nuclei via transfer reactions. SEC does not detect gamma radiation, and therefore is complementary to the ISOLDE Solenoidal Spectrometer (ISS) and Miniball experiments.

== Experimental setup ==
The SEC experiment uses radioactive ion beams from ISOLDE, at the end of XT03 beamline of the HIE-ISOLDE facility. The ion beam first passes through a collimator, of 15 mm aperture, surrounded by 4 silicon detectors, designed for beam optimisation.

The SEC chamber has a diameter of 1 m and height of 50 cm, with the reaction target placed in the centre on a motorised target holder. The target holder has the space for four targets, and each target can be moved in place via remote control. The reaction target is surrounded by double-sided silicon strip detectors (DSSSD) which are positioned so that the angular coverage is optimised, depending on the experiment. DSSSDs allow for efficient detection of all emitted particles in the reaction. The main support for the detector is a circular movable table which has radially arranged holes at the centre.

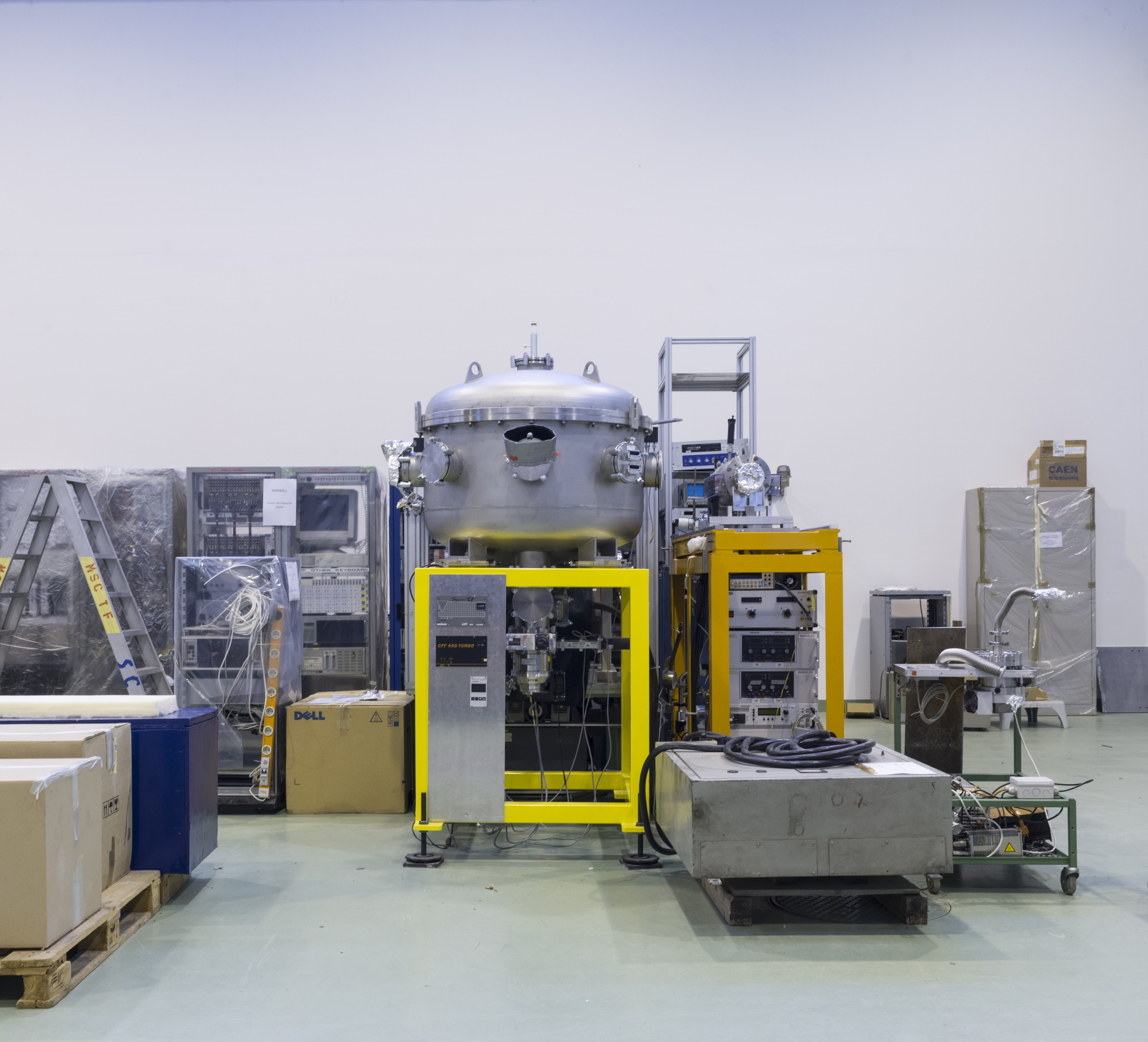
SEC experiment at the ISOLDE facility (CERN)

=== GLORIA ===
GLORIA (GLObal ReactIon Array) is a configuration used in SEC to measure fragments produced in reactions. It consists of six silicon telescopes, which surround a certain scattering angle of the reaction target (from 15° to 160°. GLORIA was designed to have a compact geometry with the ability to resolve mass and ion charge up to carbon isotopes, due to the two-stage DSSD telescopes.

=== SAND ===
The SAND array is used at the scattering chamber SEC, for the detection of charged particles and neutrons. The array consists of 30 modules, each being a plastic scintillator with fast photomultiplier tubes. The array can be moved to bring it closer to the target.
