= EC-SLI experiment =

Isotope Separator On Line Device (ISOLDE)
List of ISOLDE experimental setups
- COLLAPS, CRIS, EC-SLI, IDS, ISS, ISOLTRAP, LUCRECIA, Miniball, MIRACLS, SEC, VITO, WISArD

Other facilities
- MEDICIS: Medical Isotopes Collected from ISOLDE
- 508: Solid State Physics Laboratory

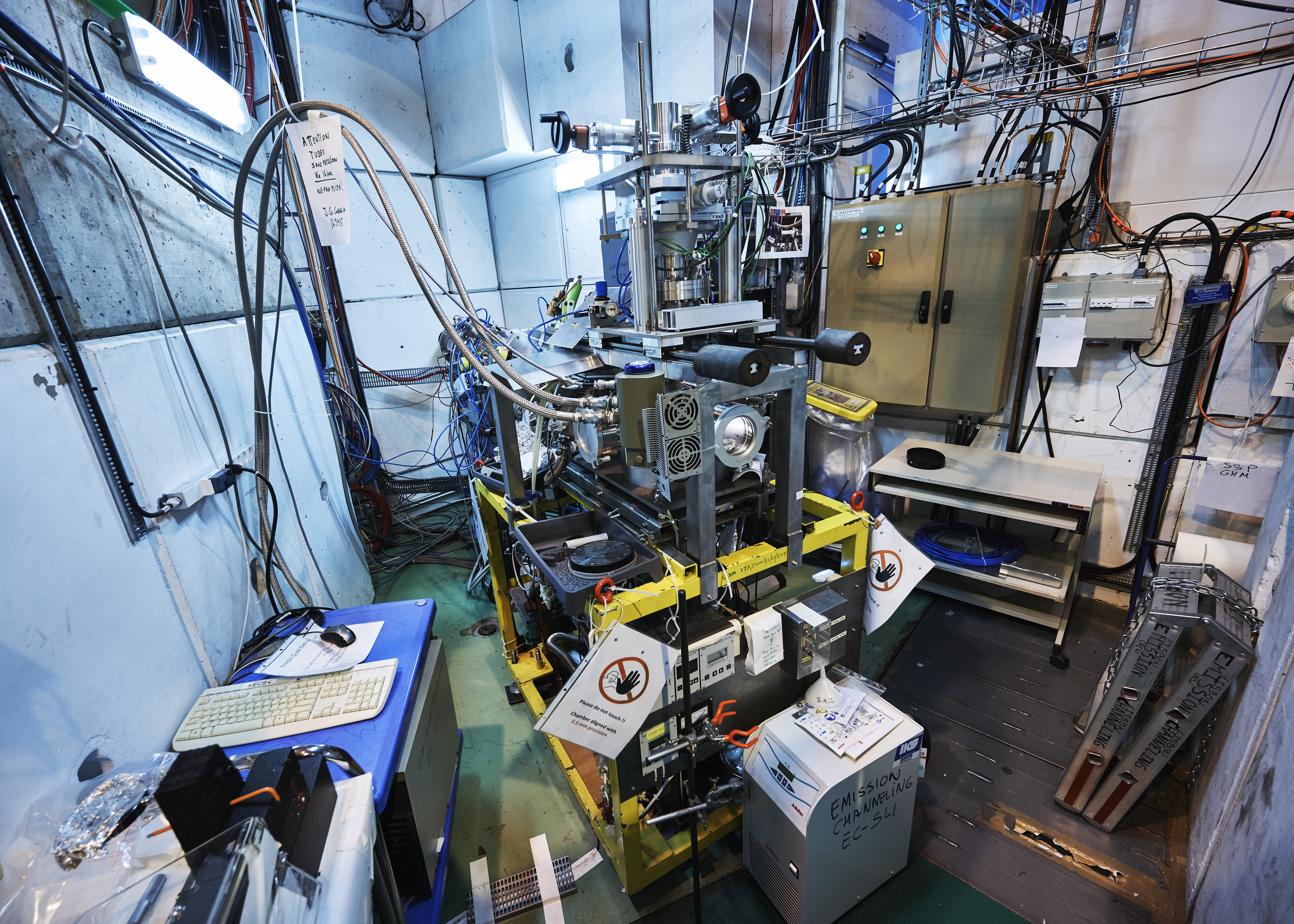
The EC-SLI experiment at ISOLDE

The Emission Channeling with Short-Lived Isotopes (EC-SLI) experiment is a permanent setup located within the ISOLDE facility and CERN. The purpose of the experiment is to study lattice locations of dopants and impurities in both single crystals and epitaxial thin films. The experiment uses short-lived isotopes from the ISOLDE on-line beamline, as well as longer-lived isotopes from three off-line beamlines.

== Background ==
The EC-SLI experiment uses the method of emission channelling (EC) to identify the position of short-lived isotopes in a single crystal lattice. Radioactive isotope probes are introduced into the crystal using ion implantation, and a positron-sensitive detector detects its decay particles. The particles that the isotope emits interact with the electrons and nuclei of the crystal's atoms, and experience channeling and blocking effects on their way out of the crystal.

The yield of the emitted particles is dependent on the position of the detector relative to the crystallographic axes. Therefore, the position of the isotope within the lattice can be determined by taking measurements of electron intensity and comparing them to simulated results. The emission patterns produced are characteristic of the lattice sites occupied by the isotopes, determining its functional properties (i.e. n-type or p-type doping). The benefits of emission channelling include an increase in efficiency by roughly four orders of magnitude and the study of elements lighter than the host atoms used.

== Experimental setup ==
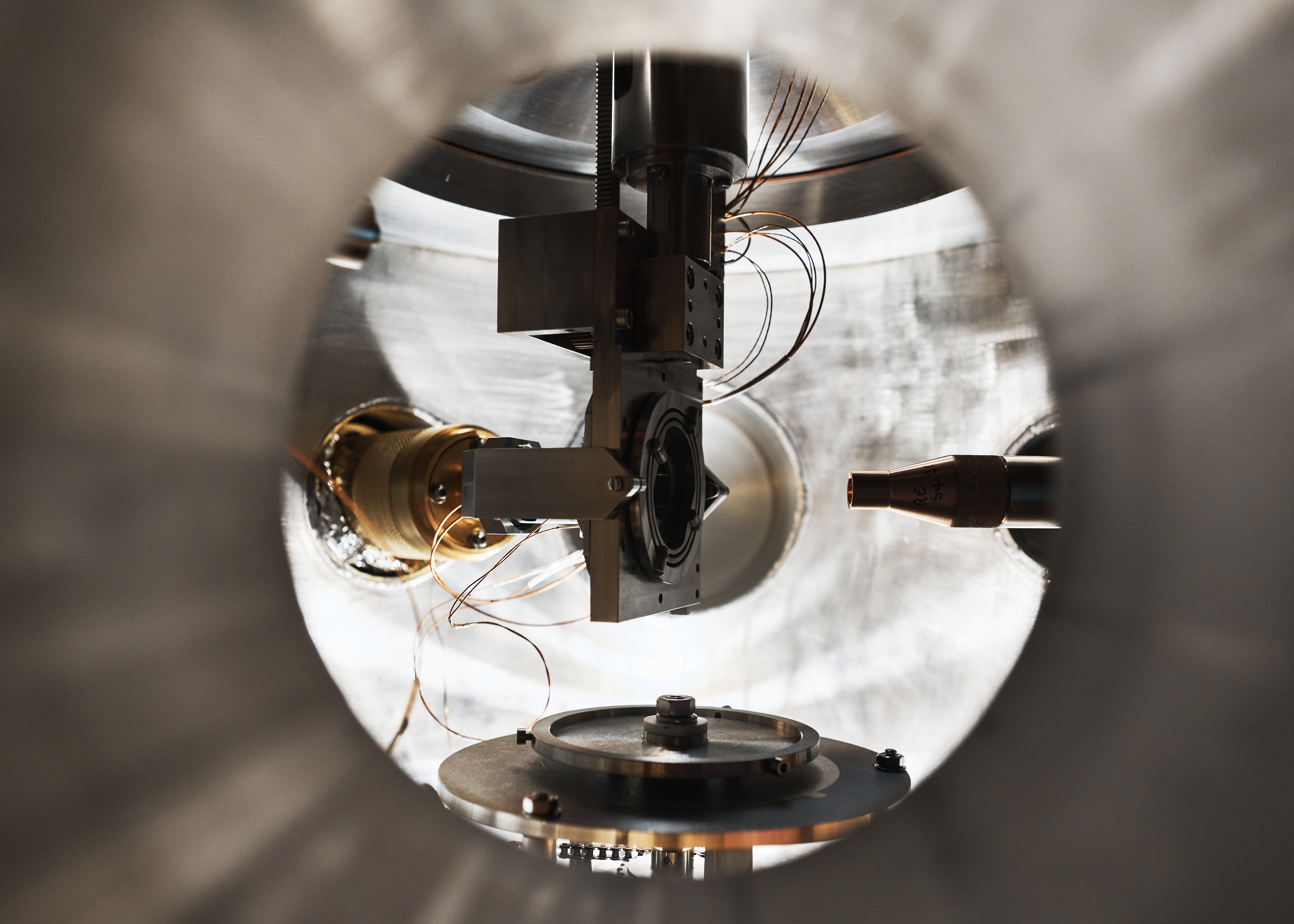
Interior view of the EC-SLI experimental setup

The experimental setup for the EC-SLI experiment is assembled on an adjustable frame structure with three sections: a beam tube and collimation chamber, experimental, and a vacuum block. It is mounted to the GHM beamline at the ISOLDE facility.

The emission channelling measurements take place in a cylindrical-shaped chamber after the samples are implanted and cooled. Upon flanges inserted along the chamber's perimeter, are auxiliary devices including a cryogenic cooler, Faraday cup, view ports and a load lock. Special format flanges mount electron detector cases, links to the vacuum station, a lightening quartz lamp, the thermal shield actuator feedthrough, and goniometers, at various points around the chamber. Two rigidly aligned collimators connect to a beam transport tube, allowing the ISOLDE ion beams to be optimally transported and focused.

== Results ==
The EC-SLI experiment has been successfully involved in determining the lattice locations of short-lived isotopes in a variety of semiconductor materials. The focus of emission channeling experiments at ISOLDE are investigations into lattice locations of transition metal probes, and p-type doping using short-lived alkaline earth probes or long-lived probes.

A current research aim is to continue the characterisation of quantum colour centres in diamond using the emission channeling technique, in order to correlate lattice locations with optical properties.
