= COLLAPS experiment =

Isotope Separator On Line Device (ISOLDE)
List of ISOLDE experimental setups
- COLLAPS, CRIS, EC-SLI, IDS, ISS, ISOLTRAP, LUCRECIA, Miniball, MIRACLS, SEC, VITO, WISArD

Other facilities
- MEDICIS: Medical Isotopes Collected from ISOLDE
- 508: Solid State Physics Laboratory

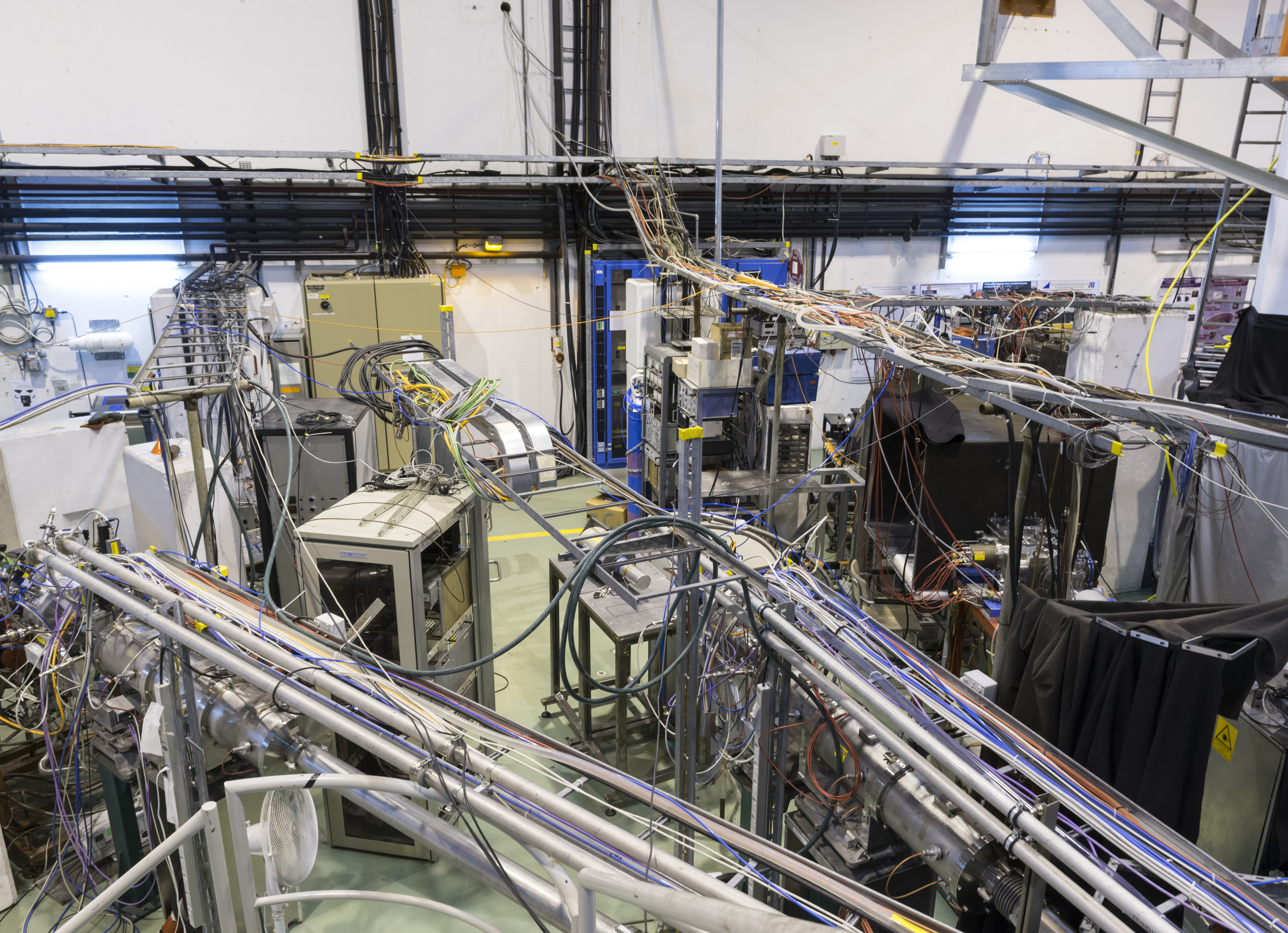
COLLAPS experiment and spectroscopy beam lines in the ISOLDE facility at CERN

The COLlinear LAser sPectroScopy (COLLAPS) experiment is located in the ISOLDE facility at CERN. The purpose of the experiment is to investigate ground and isomeric state properties of exotic, short lived nuclei, including spins, electro-magnetic moments and charge radii. The experiment has been operating since the late 1970s, and is the oldest active experiment at ISOLDE.

== Background ==
The technique of collinear spectroscopy was developed in the mid-1970s by S.L. Kaufman. This describes a method of obtaining narrow absorption lines, specifically providing a sensitivity ideal for experiments on short-lived isotopes.

Two beams are used in the technique: a laser beam sent through the sample, and a probe beam. The alignment of both beams collinearly (along the same path) allow for control of the time and spatial overlap. This enables investigation into the nuclear properties of the sample simultaneously.

== Experiment setup ==
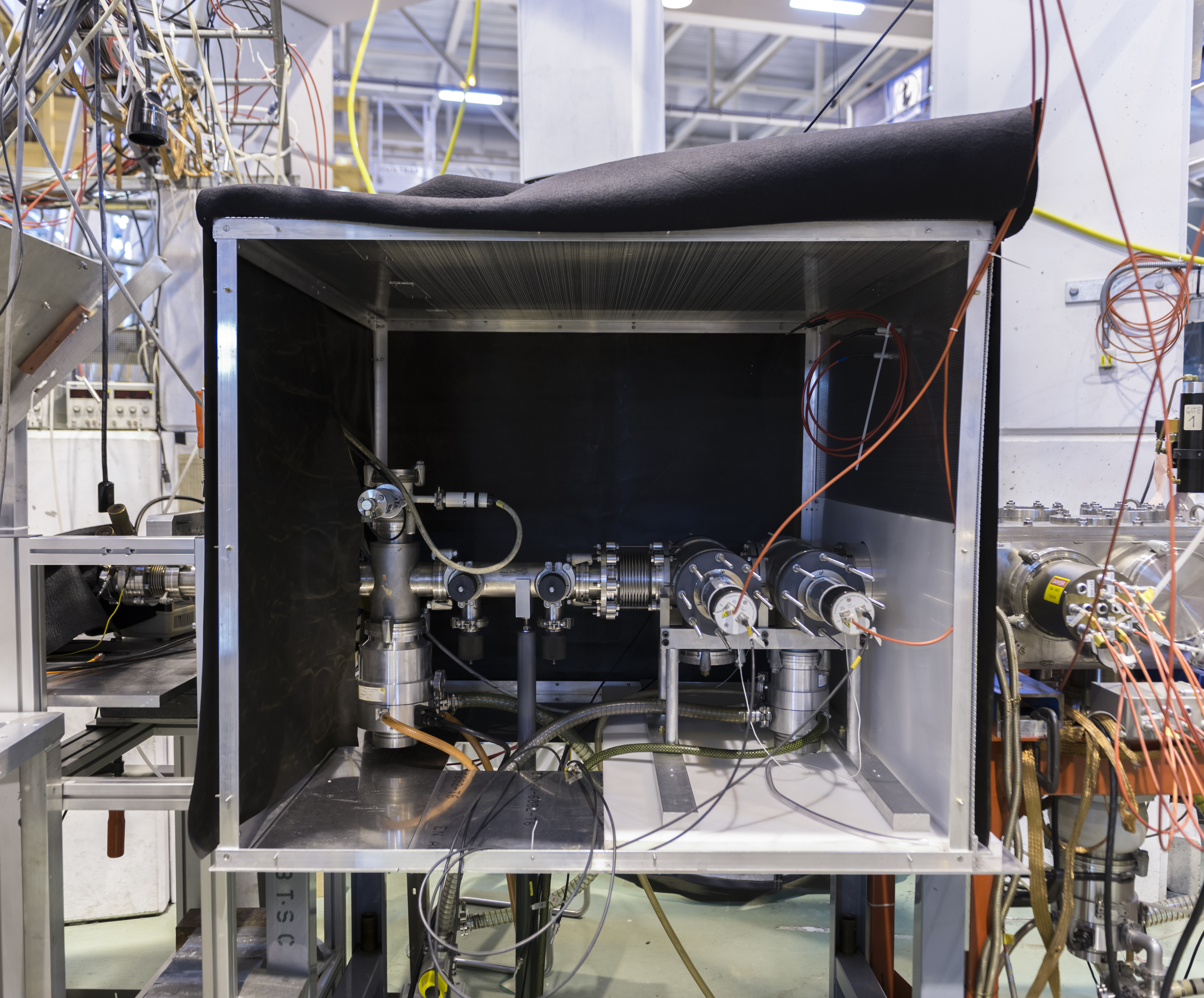
Optical detection region at COLLAPS in the ISOLDE facility

COLLAPS is located within the ISOLDE facility at CERN, giving it access to the radioactive ions produced by ISOLDE's resonance ionisation laser ion source (RILIS). The ions are delivered to the COLLAPS beamline and are excited using tunable continuous-wave lasers through the technique of collinear spectroscopy. The laser systems produce laser light in the 210 nm to 1000 nm range with a narrow linewidth. The systems allow access to the atomic transitions necessary for the short-lived nuclei produced by ISOLDE.

Laser spectroscopy is better performed on a neutral atom, and therefore a charge exchange cell (CEC) is needed to neutralise the ionic beam from ISOLDE. A CEC neutralises the ions by causing the ionic beam to collide with the alkali vapours in the cell and transfer charge. Prior to entering the CEC, the ions are reaccelerated (retarded) and a scan of the atomic transition is taken using Doppler-tuning electrodes. Laser spectroscopy is then performed on the neutral atom, however can also be performed directly on the ion. The detection system, located at the end of the beamline, consists of eight large-diameter aspheric lenses. The atoms de-excite and release fluorescent light, which is transferred to the four photomultiplier tubes (PMTs) by the lenses.

== Results ==
The following are some notable results from the COLLAPS experiment.

- Charge radii, spins and electro-magnetic moments for various isotopes, including magic isotopes
- Developing the laser spectroscopy setup to examine very exotic isotopes
- Found first direct evidence for the importance of proton and neutron excitations across shell gaps in ground state wave functions of neutron-rich Mn isotopes
