= WITCH experiment =

Double Penning trap experiment

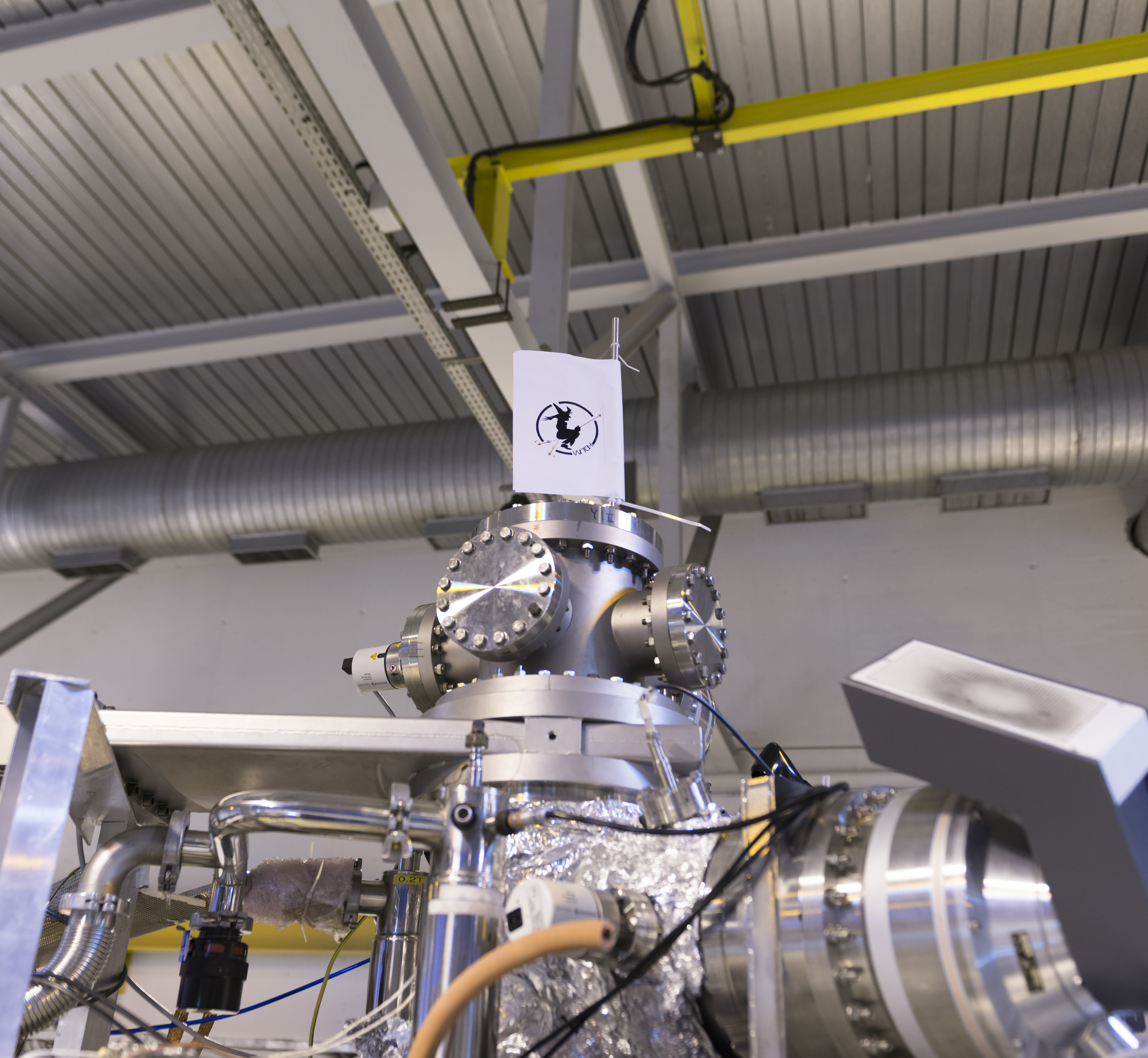
The WITCH detection chamber

WITCH (standing for "Weak Interaction Trap for Charged particles"), or experiment IS433, was a double Penning trap experiment to measure the recoil energy of decaying nuclei. A spectrometer in combination with a position-sensitive microchannel plate detector (MCP) was used to count ions while scanning their energy. The experiment was located at the ISOLDE Radioactive Ion Beam Facility in CERN. The beam from ISOLDE was bunched by REXTRAP after which it was transferred to the WITCH set-up.

The WITCH experiment completed its run in 2015, with its successor being the WISArD experiment currently running at ISOLDE.

== Physics goal ==
The first goal of the experiment was to measure the so-called beta-neutrino correlation. This could be indirectly done by measuring the shape of the spectrum of the recoiling ions. This beta-neutrino correlation can provide, if measured precisely, information about fundamental weak interaction properties. According to the Standard Model the weak interaction has a Vector–Axial vector structure, but there are also other mathematical possibilities which have not been detected in nature yet. The WITCH experiment searched for scalar currents in the first place, but. it was also possible to look for tensor currents.

Other physics goals were the search for heavy neutrinos, measuring Fermi/Gamov-Teller mixing ratios, measuring electron capture probabilities, etc.

== Experimental setup ==
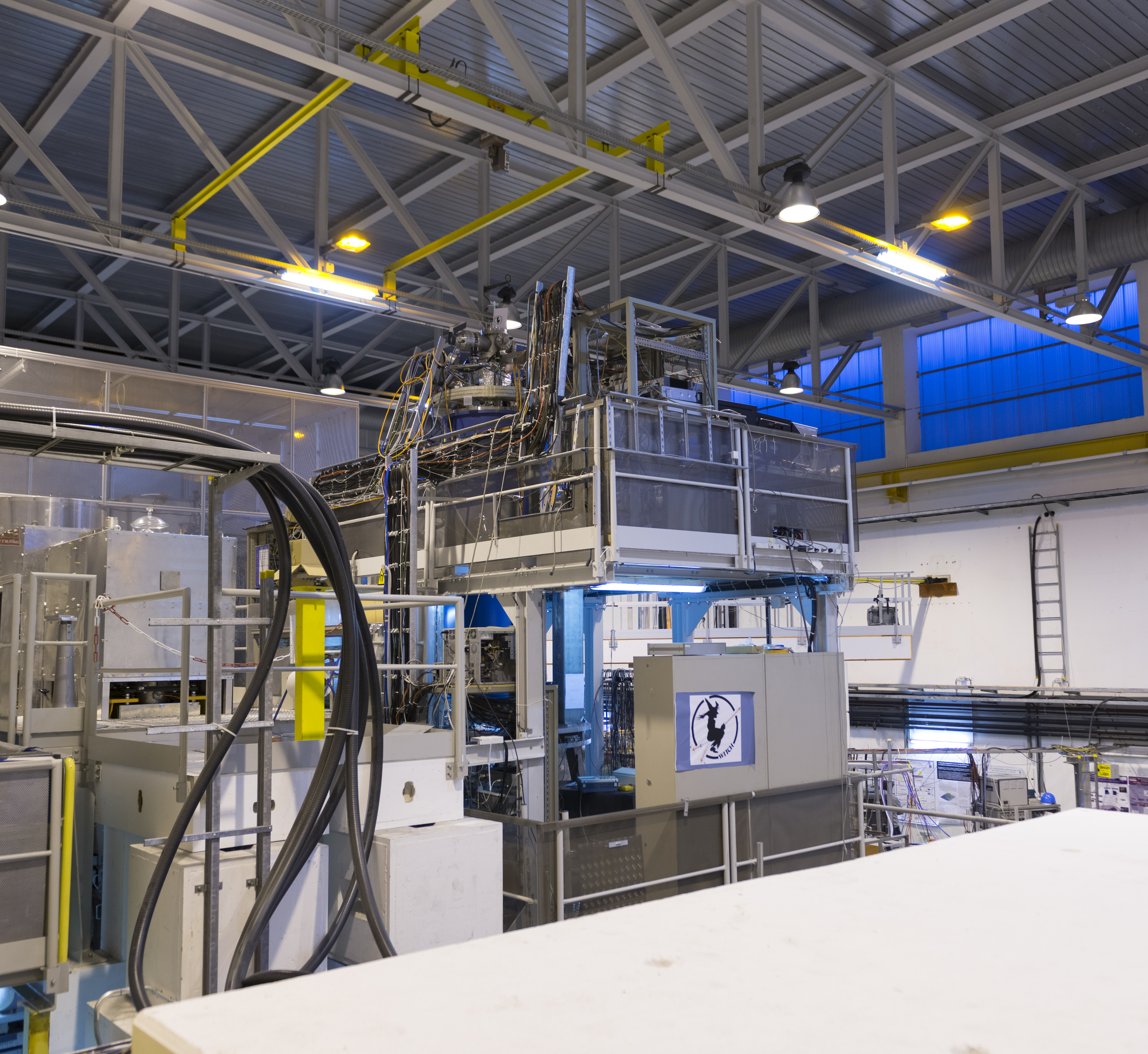
The WITCH experiment in the ISOLDE facility at CERN

The ion bunch from REXTRAP is slowed in a pulsed drift cavity in the vertical beamline. After this the bunch is injected into the 9 T magnetic field. Here the ion cloud is trapped in the first Penning trap (for cooling). Its purpose is to cool down the ions with buffer gas. In this trap, it is possible to apply different excitation modes (dipolar, quadrupolar and octopolar). The ions are then transferred to the second Penning trap (in which decays are studied).

When an ion decays, it can escape the decay trap into the spectrometer. The spectrometer consists out of a set of electrodes to create an electrical potential barrier. If the decayed ion's energy is high enough, it will be able to overcome this barrier to be detected at the top of the setup.
