= WISArD experiment =

Experimental setup at CERN

Isotope Separator On Line Device (ISOLDE)
List of ISOLDE experimental setups
- COLLAPS, CRIS, EC-SLI, IDS, ISS, ISOLTRAP, LUCRECIA, Miniball, MIRACLS, SEC, VITO, WISArD

Other facilities
- MEDICIS: Medical Isotopes Collected from ISOLDE
- 508: Solid State Physics Laboratory

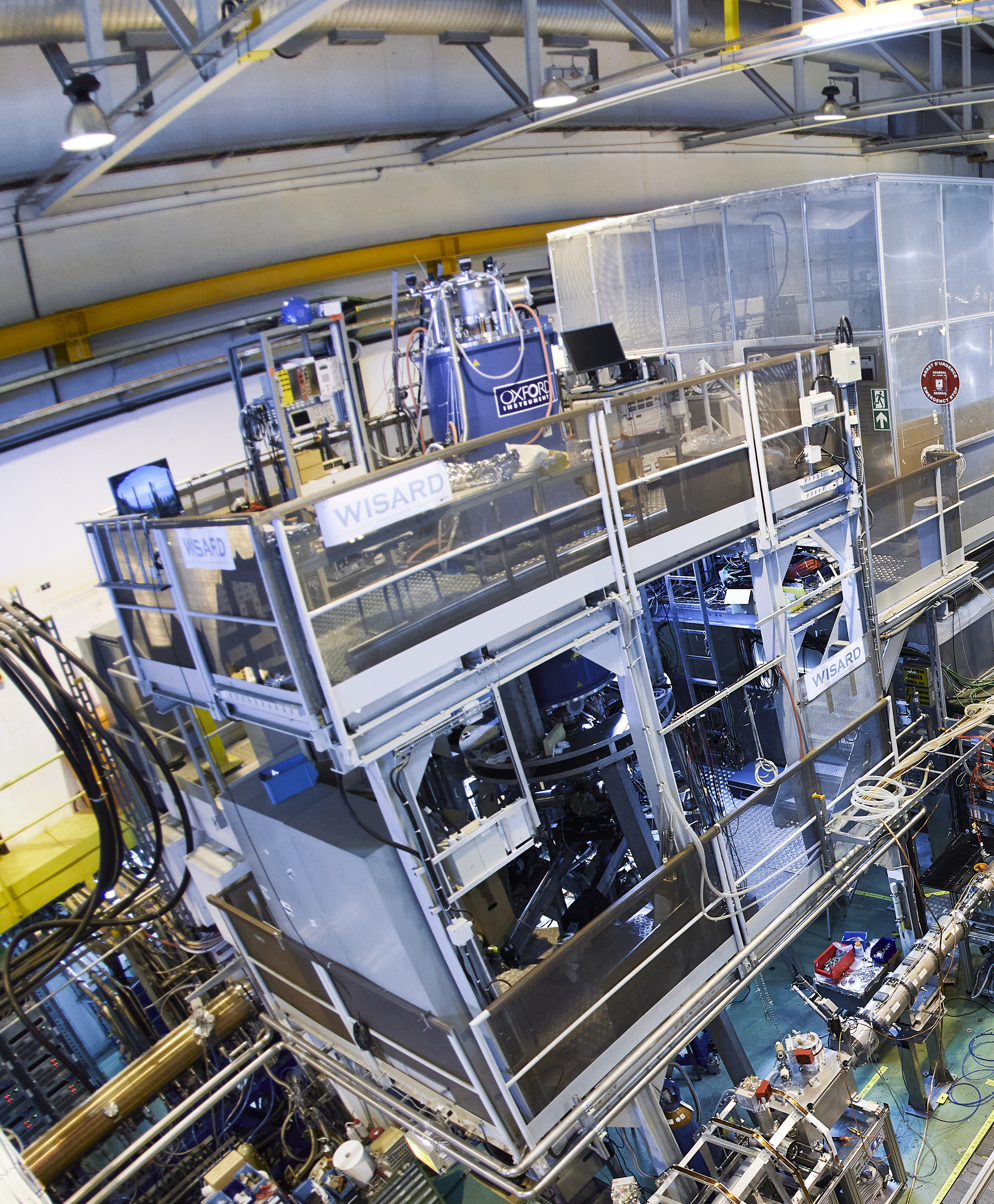
View on the ISOLDE beamlines at WISArD

The Weak Interaction Studies with 32Ar Decay (WISArD) experiment is a permanent experimental setup located in the ISOLDE facility, at CERN. The purpose of the experiment is to investigate the weak interaction by looking for beta-delayed protons emitted from a nucleus. In the absence of online isotope production during Long Shutdown 2, the experimental setup has also been used to measure the shape of the beta energy spectrum. A goal of the experiment is to search for physics beyond the Standard Model (SM) by expanding the existing limits on currents in the weak interaction.

The WISArD experimental setup reutilises the WITCH experiment's superconducting magnet and existing infrastructure.

== Background ==
The Standard Model describes three of the four fundamental interactions and classifies all known elementary particles. Whilst being essentially confirmed by the discovery of the Higgs boson, there are still many unanswered questions, specifically regarding the weak interaction. The Standard Model proposes a specific Vector – Axial Vector (V – A) formalism for the weak interaction, however other contributions are not excluded by theory. Measurements of well-selected beta decays, such as pure Fermi (F) or pure Gamow-Teller (GT) decays, may provide experimental evidence for these other contributions, as beta decays cause minimal disturbances from effects relating to nuclear structure and the pure transitions are independent of underlying nuclear interactions.

By determining the momentum of the beta particle and the neutrino, a correlation coefficient that quantifies the extent of non-SM contributions can be determined. However, it is essentially impossible to observe and measure the neutrino in this kind of experiment. Its characteristics can be determined from three-body kinematics by measuring the beta particle and the recoil of the beta-decay daughter. In the WISArD experiment, the measurement of the recoil is replaced by the measurements of the characteristics of protons emitted by the recoiling nucleus. By comparing the energy of the protons emitted, in the same and in opposite hemispheres of the experimental setup with respect to the beta particle, a kinematical shift between the two cases can be measured. This kinematical shift carries the information needed to deduce the beta-neutrino correlation and thus provides access to physics beyond the Standard Model.

Alternatively, the non-SM contributions can be studied by performing a very precise measurement of the shape of the continuous beta energy spectrum. In a detector, beta particles undergo large-angle deflections along their tracks and a particle that entered a detector may undergo sufficient deflection to re-emerge from the same surface. This is known as backscattering, and is an intrinsic limitation in conventional spectrum shape measurements. In WISArD this problem is mitigated by installing two detectors face-to-face in a high magnetic field, effectively guiding the backscattered beta particle towards the opposing detector.

== Experimental setup ==
A radioactive ion beam (RIB) of the argon isotope ^{32}Ar is produced at the ISOLDE facility in a spallation reaction (target bombarded by high-energy particles), followed by the heat diffusion of argon atoms from the target. The beam is extracted and accelerated before being mass separated by the High Resolution Separator (HRS) or General Purpose Separator (GPS). This beam is then sent to the WISArD experimental setup via beamlines.

The WISArD beam transport system consists of ion-source (IBL), horizontal (HBL), vertical (VBL) and solenoid magnet (SBL) beamlines. The IBL provides a stable ion beam and consists of an ionising unit, a conical graphite cylinder, an extraction electrode and an extraction lens. The HBL transports the RIBs to subsequent sections formed from two kicker-bender assemblies and a high-voltage Einzel lens. The VBL uses cylindrically shaped electrodes to focus and inject the beam into the SBL region, with the penultimate electrode used as an Einzel lens. The superconducting magnet section produces fields up to 9 T using the former WITCH magnet and surrounds a vacuum tube.

The detection setup (DSet2018) consists of four aluminium rods to both support the detectors and constrain the assembly. Additionally, there is a scintillation detector used for beta particle detection, silicon detectors to detect beta-delayed protons, a catcher foil for implanting the radioactive argon beam on, and a ^{208}Po alpha source. The catcher foil is placed in the centre of the magnetic field, with four silicon detectors positioned above and four below. Positrons are guided to the scintillation detector by the magnetic field.

=== Upgrades ===
Following the initial run of WISArD in 2018, several upgrades were made to the setup.

The total transport efficiency of the ion-beam system was improved from 12% to close to 90% from Nov2018 to Upg2021. This was done by optimising the electrostatic elements of the beamline, and reducing the effect of the fringe fields (outer magnetic fields) by focusing the beam prior to it entering the fringe field region.

New silicon detectors were tailor-made for the experiment, improving the solid angle coverage and energy resolution. Additionally, a modification of the plastic scintillation detector was made to lower the detection threshold and therefore limit the effect of backscattering. Furthermore, a better compact microchannel plate (MCP) was designed to measure the position and the extension of the argon beam, information needed for reaching a desired precision level for the correlation coefficient.

== Results ==
The results from the first beta-neutrino correlation campaign with ^{32}Ar in November 2018 showed the proof-of-principle by successfully measuring the proton kinematic energy shift and testing the system. The new test run in 2021 showed that all components of the new setup work and improvements with respect to the first campaign could be achieved. It is foreseen that the full scale experiment with ^{32}Ar will run in the first half of 2024.

In November and December 2020, a first beta spectrum shape measurement was performed with ^{114}In. This yielded the first experimental determination of the weak magnetism form factor, which contains the major part of the effect of the strong interaction on the weak interaction-driven beta decay, for such a heavy nucleus. The result is in agreement with that of a twin-experiment using instead a multi-wire drift chamber based beta spectrometer.
