= LUCRECIA experiment =

Isotope Separator On Line Device (ISOLDE)
List of ISOLDE experimental setups
- COLLAPS, CRIS, EC-SLI, IDS, ISS, ISOLTRAP, LUCRECIA, Miniball, MIRACLS, SEC, VITO, WISArD

Other facilities
- MEDICIS: Medical Isotopes Collected from ISOLDE
- 508: Solid State Physics Laboratory

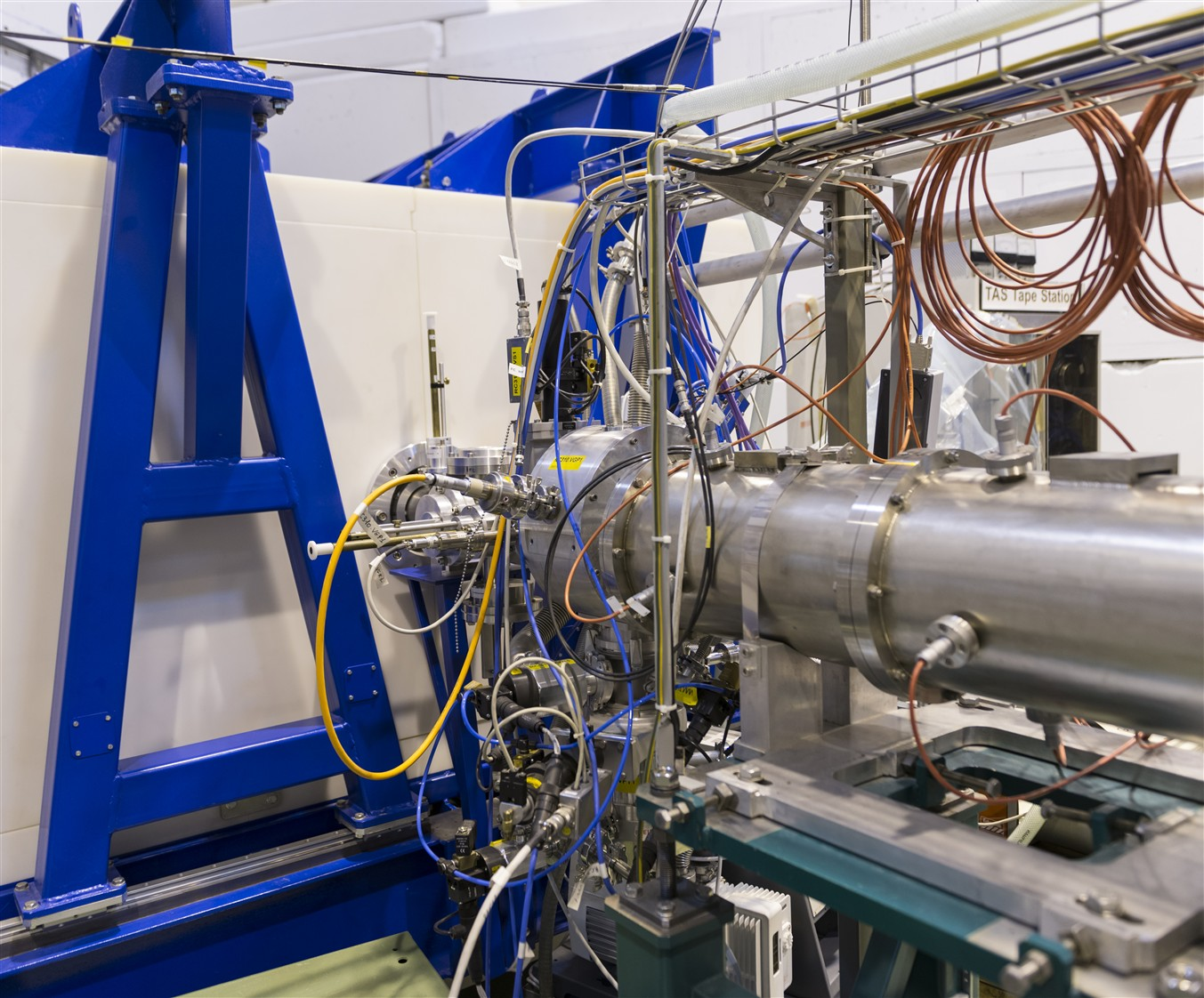
LUCRECIA - the total absorption spectrometer (TAS) at ISOLDE

The LUCRECIA experiment is a permanent experimental setup at the ISOLDE facility at CERN. The purpose of LUCRECIA is to analyse nuclear structure and use this to confirm theoretical models and make stellar predictions. The experiment is based on a Total Absorption gamma Spectrometer (TAS) designed to measure beta ray feeding.

== Background ==
When an unstable parent nucleus decays via beta decay, there may be subsequent gamma radiation emitted. The decay will depend on the parent nucleus and the available levels and gamma transitions that could take place in the daughter nucleus. The technique of measuring the gamma radiation with good efficiency is known as total absorption spectroscopy.

The pandemonium effect concerns the difficulty in using high resolution detectors in beta decay experiments, to construct a complex level scheme. Low efficiency detectors will lead to some gamma ray transitions to be omitted from the data set, and the determined feeding pattern is incorrect. A feeding pattern refers to the probability of the parent nucleus to directly decay to a level in the daughter nucleus.

A total absorption spectrometer is made of a scintillator crystal, covering almost all of the solid angle surrounding the radioactive sample. Ideally, the crystal would be thick enough to have close to a 100% total efficiency, and should be blind to any other type of radiation. Photomultipliers (PMTs) are attached to the crystal to collect the gamma scintillating light produced in the crystal by the gamma radiation. The technique used may counter the pandemonium effect.

== Experimental setup ==
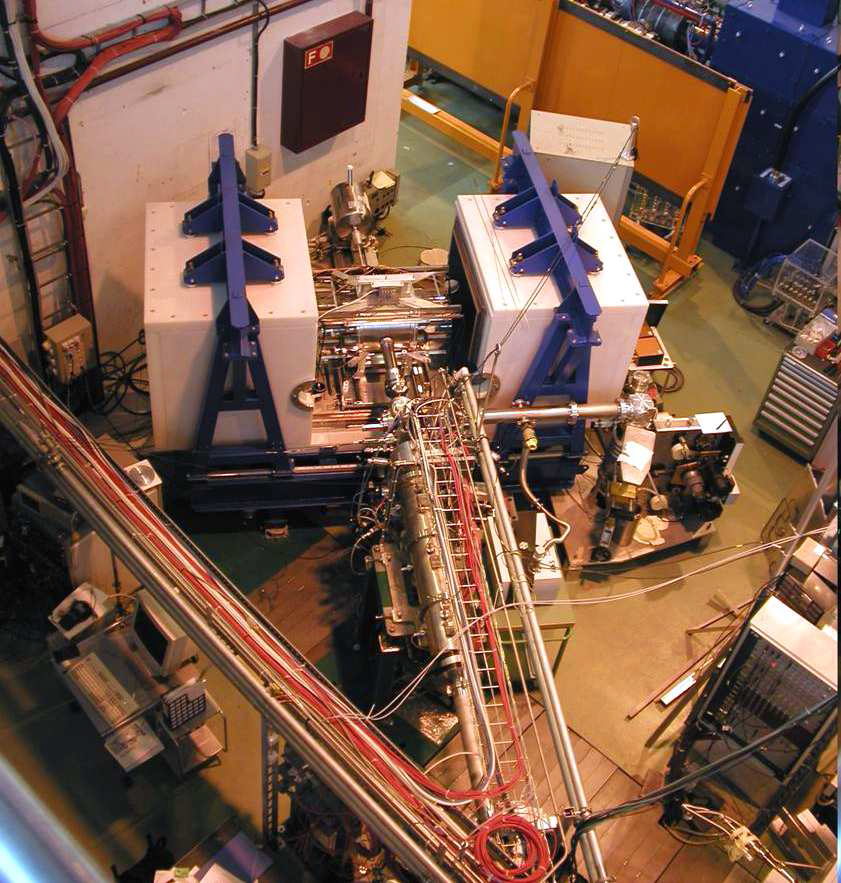
Lucrecia measuring station with shielding in white and beam line.

LUCRECIA is installed at the end of one of the ISOLDE beam lines, and consists of the TAS with a tape station for implanting the radioactive activity. Radioactive ion beams from ISOLDE are implanted onto the tape (held by a beam pipe) which is then transported to the centre of the TAS for measurement. By changing the position of the rollers, it is possible to implant the beam directly in the centre of the TAS, which allows for measurements of more exotic nuclei with shorter half-lives or outside the spectrometer and the moved into the detector.

The TAS is made of a piece of NaI(Tl) cylindrically shaped with a height of 38 cm. The 7.5 cm diameter cylindrical cavity runs perpendicularly to its axis of symmetry. The cavity allows the beam pipe to enter into the detector and position the radioactive source in the centre of the detector, and allows the placement of ancillary detectors on the opposite side to measure other radiation such as the beta particles, X-rays or gamma radiation. The use of the cavity decreases LUCRECIA's total efficiency (to around 90% for a range of 300 to 3000 keV). Eight PMTs are used to collect light, and the total counting rate is kept below 10 kHz to avoid pileup contributions.

Around the TAS there is a 19 cm thick shielding box made of four layers: polythene, lead, copper and aluminium. The box absorbs most external radiation, including neutrons, cosmic rays and background from the facility.

== Results ==
The results from experiments performed at the LUCRECIA setup, have been able to confirm theoretical predictions on the prolate shape of ^{76}Sr ground state and an admixture of prolate and oblate shape for ^{74}Kr ground state.

Similar studies have been carried out in the neutron deficient mercury region.

Currently, several experiments are in "preparation" stages using the LUCRECIA setup at the ISOLDE facility.
