= CRIS experiment =

Isotope Separator On Line Device (ISOLDE)
List of ISOLDE experimental setups
- COLLAPS, CRIS, EC-SLI, IDS, ISS, ISOLTRAP, LUCRECIA, Miniball, MIRACLS, SEC, VITO, WISArD

Other facilities
- MEDICIS: Medical Isotopes Collected from ISOLDE
- 508: Solid State Physics Laboratory

The Collinear Resonance Ionization Spectroscopy (CRIS) experiment at ISOLDE

The Collinear Resonance Ionization Spectroscopy (CRIS) experiment is located in the ISOLDE facility at CERN. The experiment aims to study ground-state properties of exotic nuclei and produce high purity isomeric beams used for decay studies. CRIS does this by using the high resolution technique of fast beam collinear laser spectroscopy, with the high efficiency technique of resonance ionization.

== Background ==
The technique of fast beam collinear resonance ionization spectroscopy is a merger of two traditional approaches to laser spectroscopy: in-source resonance ionization spectroscopy and fluorescence-detection fast beam collinear laser spectroscopy.

Resonance ionization spectroscopy is based on stepwise photo-ionization, which uses tunable lasers to match the laser light's photon energy to an atomic transition of an element. The photons will be resonantly absorbed if the light is incident on an atomic beam. By using a series of precisely tuned lasers, an electron will be excited through the energy level structure almost to the ionization potential of the element. The element can then be ionized to an autoionising state or non-resonant ionization state. The technique allows for an elemental selectivity in ionization and isotopic selectivity in measurement, as other elements will not be affected by the tuned laser light.

Fluorescence-detection fast beam collinear laser spectroscopy is a high-resolution technique that resolves the hyperfine structure and isotope shift of an atomic transition. This is done by superimposing two beams, an ionic or atomic beam and a tuned narrow-bandwidth laser beam. At resonance, the beam is scanned and fluorescent photons are emitted and collected by a photon detector. The fast beam used in this technique limits the distribution of kinetic energies, and reduces the Doppler broadening of the resonance peak.

== Experimental setup ==
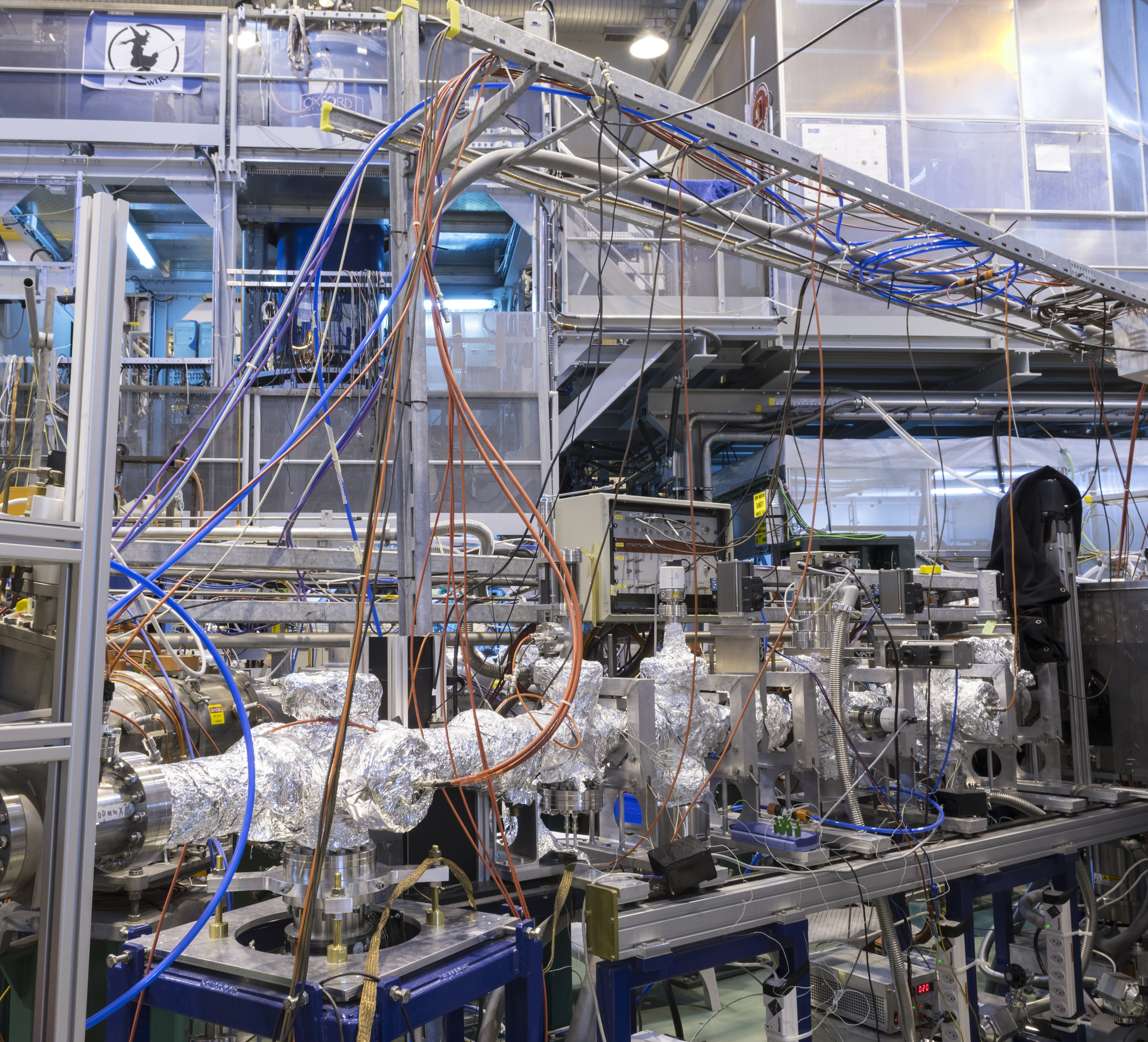
CRIS beamline in the ISOLDE facility at CERN

CRIS bends bunched radioactive beams that have been accelerated, mass separated and cooled to room temperature, produced by the ISOLDE facility and directs them to overlap in space and time with the pulsed laser beams. An alkali-filled charge exchange cell (CEC) is used to neutralise the ion beam, before it is directed through a differential pumping region and deflector plates. Here, the residual ions that weren't neutralised are deflected and dumped, and the neutral beam proceeds to the interaction region, kept at ultra high vacuum (10^{−10} mbar).

In the interaction region, the atoms are resonantly ionized by the lasers and then deflected through horizontal and vertical deflection plates. Scanning the narrow frequency band of the lasers, while monitoring the ion count rate yields a spectrum of the hyperfine structure of the atom.

The ions are counted with a MagneToF ion detector (previously a micro channel plate was used), and at the end of the beamline the Decay Spectroscopy Station (DSS) allows CRIS to make decay measurements of the isotopes.

== Results ==
Prior to the CRIS experiment, the first demonstration of the new fast beam collinear resonance ionization technique at the ISOLDE facility resulted in an efficiency of 0.001%, due to a low duty cycle. In 2008, the CRIS experiment was proposed to implement this technique to simultaneously achieve high efficiency and resolution. Since then, the experiment has demonstrated a 1% experimental efficiency.

In 2012, the CRIS experiment performed their first sensitive measurements of francium isotopes and found good agreement with model predictions of its nuclear structure. Since then, the experiment has been able to make more precision measurements of nuclear structure, including charge radii, electromagnetic dipole and quadrupole moments, and isotope shifts.

Since 2020, the CRIS experiment has been working on a new approach to study short-lived radioactive molecules. These radioactive molecules are promising probes to uncover new physics.
