= Trapping region =

In applied mathematics, a trapping region of a dynamical system is a region such that every trajectory that starts within the trapping region will move to the region's interior and remain there as the system evolves.

More precisely, given a dynamical system with flow $\phi_t$ defined on the phase space $D$, a subset of the phase space $N$ is a trapping region if it is compact and $\phi_t(N) \subset \mathrm{int}(N)$ for all $t > 0$.
