= Coulomb excitation =

Experimental nuclear physics technique

In experimental nuclear physics, Coulomb excitation is a technique to probe the electromagnetic aspect of nuclear structure. In Coulomb excitation, an atomic nucleus is excited by an inelastic collision with another nucleus through the electromagnetic interaction. In order to ensure that the interaction is electromagnetic in nature – i.e., that the nuclei interact via the Coulomb force rather than the nuclear force – the distance of closest approach of the colliding nuclei has to be sufficiently large. In particular, in low-energy Coulomb excitation (taking place at beam energies of a few megaelectronvolts per nucleon) the commonly adopted empirical criterion is that if the surfaces of the colliding nuclei are separated by at least 5 femtometers, the contribution of the short-range nuclear interaction to the excitation process can be neglected. From the measured excitation cross sections, electromagnetic transition probabilities between the nuclear energy levels can be extracted. This method is particularly useful for investigating collectivity in nuclei, as collective excitations are often connected by strong electric quadrupole transitions. Moreover, it is the only experimental method in nuclear physics that is sensitive to electric quadrupole moments of excited nuclear states with lifetimes shorter than nanoseconds.
