= Charged particle =

Physical particle with an electric charge

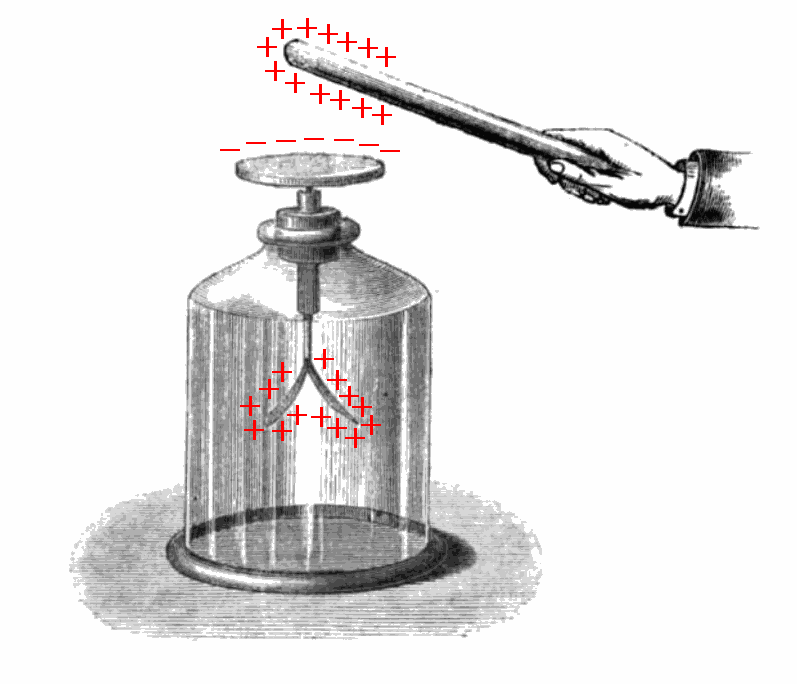
A gold leaf electroscope, an antique scientific instrument invented in 1787 by British clergyman Abraham Bennett that detects electric charge.

In physics, a charged particle is a particle with an electric charge. For example, some elementary particles, like the electron or quarks are charged. Some composite particles like protons are charged particles. An ion, such as a molecule or atom with a surplus or deficit of electrons relative to protons are also charged particles.

A plasma is a collection of charged particles, atomic nuclei and separated electrons, but can also be a gas containing a significant proportion of charged particles.

Charged particles are labeled as either positive (+) or negative (-). The designations are arbitrary. Nothing is inherent to a positively charged particle that makes it "positive", and the same goes for negatively charged particles.

== Examples ==
=== Positively charged particles ===
- protons
- positrons (antielectrons)
- positively charged pions
- alpha particles
- cations

=== Negatively charged particles ===
- electrons
- antiprotons
- muons
- tauons
- negative charged pions
- anions

=== Particles with zero charge ===
- neutrons
- photons
- neutrinos
- neutral pions
- z boson
- higgs boson
- atoms

== See also ==
- Charge carrier – refers to moving charged particles that create an electric current
