= ISOLDE =

Physics facility at CERN

Coordinates: 46°14′03″N 6°02′52″E

Isotope Separator On Line Device (ISOLDE)
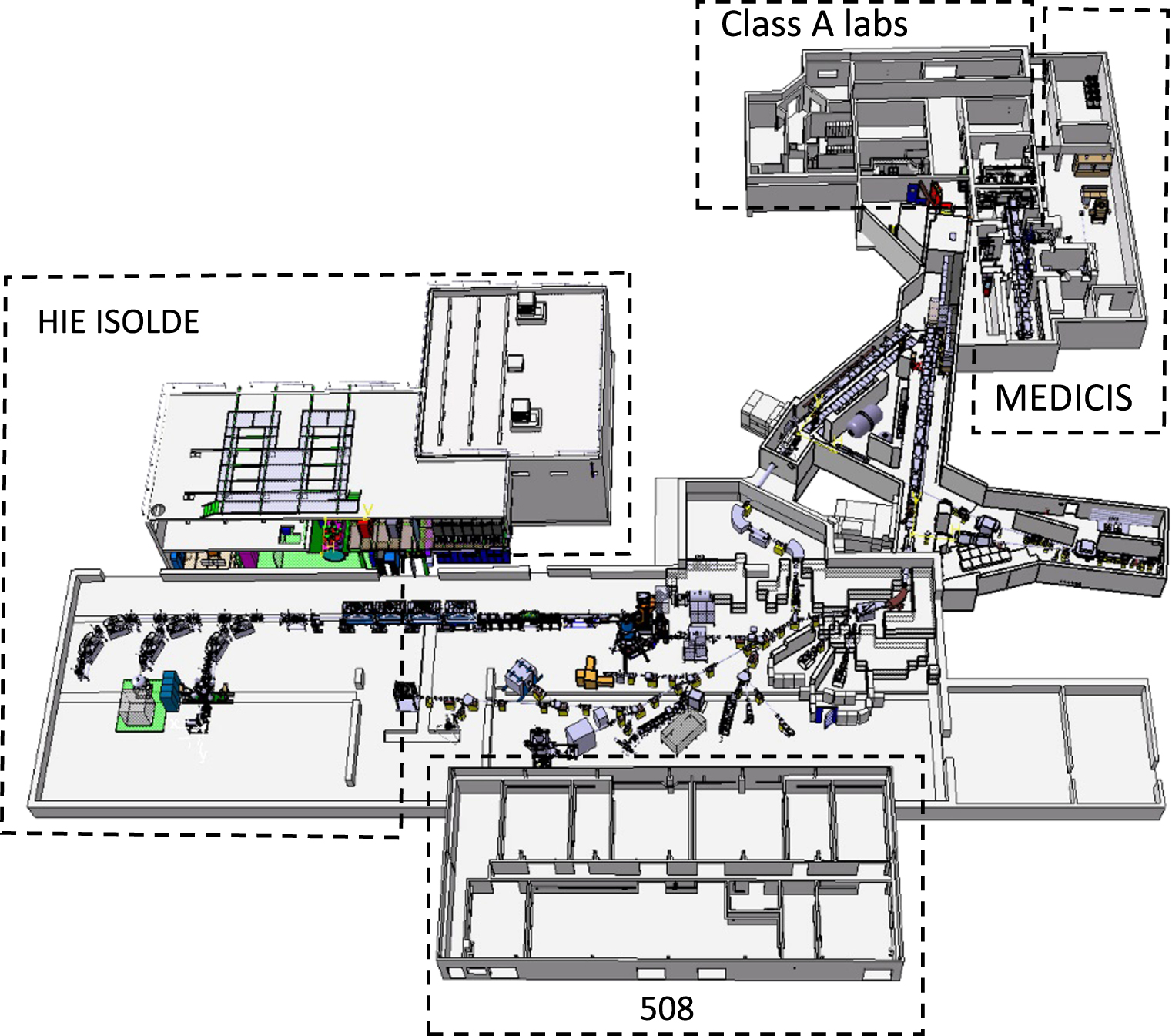
- Schematic of the ISOLDE facility.

ISOLDE experimental setups
- COLLAPS: Colinear Laser Spectroscopy
- CRIS: Collinear Resonance Ionization Spectroscopy
- EC-SLI: Emission Channeling with Short-Lived Isotopes
- IDS: ISOLDE Decay Station experiment
- ISS: ISOLDE Solenoidal Spectrometer
- ISOLTRAP: ISOLTRAP
- LUCRECIA: LUCRECIA
- Miniball: Miniball
- MIRACLS: Multi Ion Reflection Apparatus for Collinear Spectroscopy
- SEC: Scattering Chamber Experiments
- VITO: Versatile Ion Polarisation Technique Online
- WISArD: Weak Interaction Studies with Radioactive Ion-Beams

Other facilities
- MEDICIS: Medical Isotopes Collected from ISOLDE
- 508: Solid State Physics Laboratory

ISOLDE experimental hall.

The ISOLDE (Isotope Separator On Line DEvice) Radioactive Ion Beam Facility, is an on-line isotope separator facility located at the centre of the CERN accelerator complex on the Franco-Swiss border. Created in 1964, the ISOLDE facility started delivering radioactive ion beams (RIBs) to users in 1967. Originally located at the synchro-cyclotron (SC) accelerator (CERN's first ever particle accelerator), the facility has been upgraded several times most notably in 1992 when the whole facility was moved to be connected to CERN's proton synchroton booster (PSB). ISOLDE is currently the longest-running facility in operation at CERN, with continuous developments of the facility and its experiments keeping ISOLDE at the forefront of science with RIBs. ISOLDE benefits a wide range of physics communities with applications covering nuclear, atomic, molecular and solid-state physics, but also biophysics and astrophysics, as well as high-precision experiments looking for physics beyond the Standard Model. The facility is operated by the ISOLDE Collaboration, comprising CERN and sixteen (mostly) European countries. As of 2019, close to 1,000 experimentalists around the world (including all continents) are coming to ISOLDE to perform typically 50 different experiments per year.

Radioactive nuclei are produced at ISOLDE by shooting a high-energy (1.4GeV) beam of protons delivered by CERN's PSB accelerator on a 20 cm thick target. Several target materials are used depending on the desired final isotopes that are requested by the experimentalists. The interaction of the proton beam with the target material produces radioactive species through spallation, fragmentation and fission reactions. They are subsequently extracted from the bulk of the target material through thermal diffusion processes by heating the target to about 2,000 °C.

The cocktail of produced isotopes is ultimately filtered using one of ISOLDE's two magnetic dipole mass separators to yield the desired isobar of interest. The time required for the extraction process to occur is dictated by the nature of the desired isotope and/or that of the target material and places a lower limit on the half-life of isotopes which can be produced by this method, and is typically of the order of a few milliseconds. For an additional separation, the Resonance Ionisation Laser Ion Source (RILIS) uses lasers to ionise a particular element, which separates the radioisotopes by their atomic number. Once extracted, the isotopes are directed either to one of several low-energy nuclear physics experiments or an isotope-harvesting area. A major upgrade of the REX post-accelerator to the HIE-ISOLDE (High Intensity and Energy Upgrade) superconducting linac completed construction in 2018, allowing for the re-acceleration of radioisotopes to higher energies than previously achievable.

== Background ==
Most atomic nuclei contain protons and neutrons. The number of protons determines the chemical element the nucleus belongs to. Different isotopes of the same element have different numbers of neutrons in their nuclei, but contain the same number of protons. For example, isotopes of carbon include carbon-12, carbon-13, carbon-14, which contain 6, 7, 8 neutrons respectively, but all contain 6 protons. Each isotope of an element has a different nuclear energy state, and may have different stability.

Table of nuclides

A nuclide is a more general term than isotope, and refers to atoms that have any particular number of protons and neutrons. Stable nuclides are not radioactive and do not spontaneously undergo radioactive decay, so are more usually found in nature. Whereas unstable (i.e. radioactive) nuclides are not found in nature, unless there is a recent source of them, because they are shorter lived, and will spontaneously decay, in one or more steps, to more stable nuclides. For example, carbon-14 is unstable but is found in nature. Scientists use accelerators and nuclear reactors to produce radioactive nuclides. As a general trend, and among other factors, the neutron–proton ratio of a nuclide determines its stability. The value of this ratio for stable nuclides generally increases for larger nuclei with more protons and neutrons. Many unstable nuclides have neutron-proton ratios beyond the zone of stability. The time required to lose half of a quantity of a given nuclide through radioactive decays, the half-life, is a measure of how stable an isotope is.

Nuclides can be visually represented on a table (Segré chart or table of nuclides) where the proton number is plotted against the neutron number.

== History ==
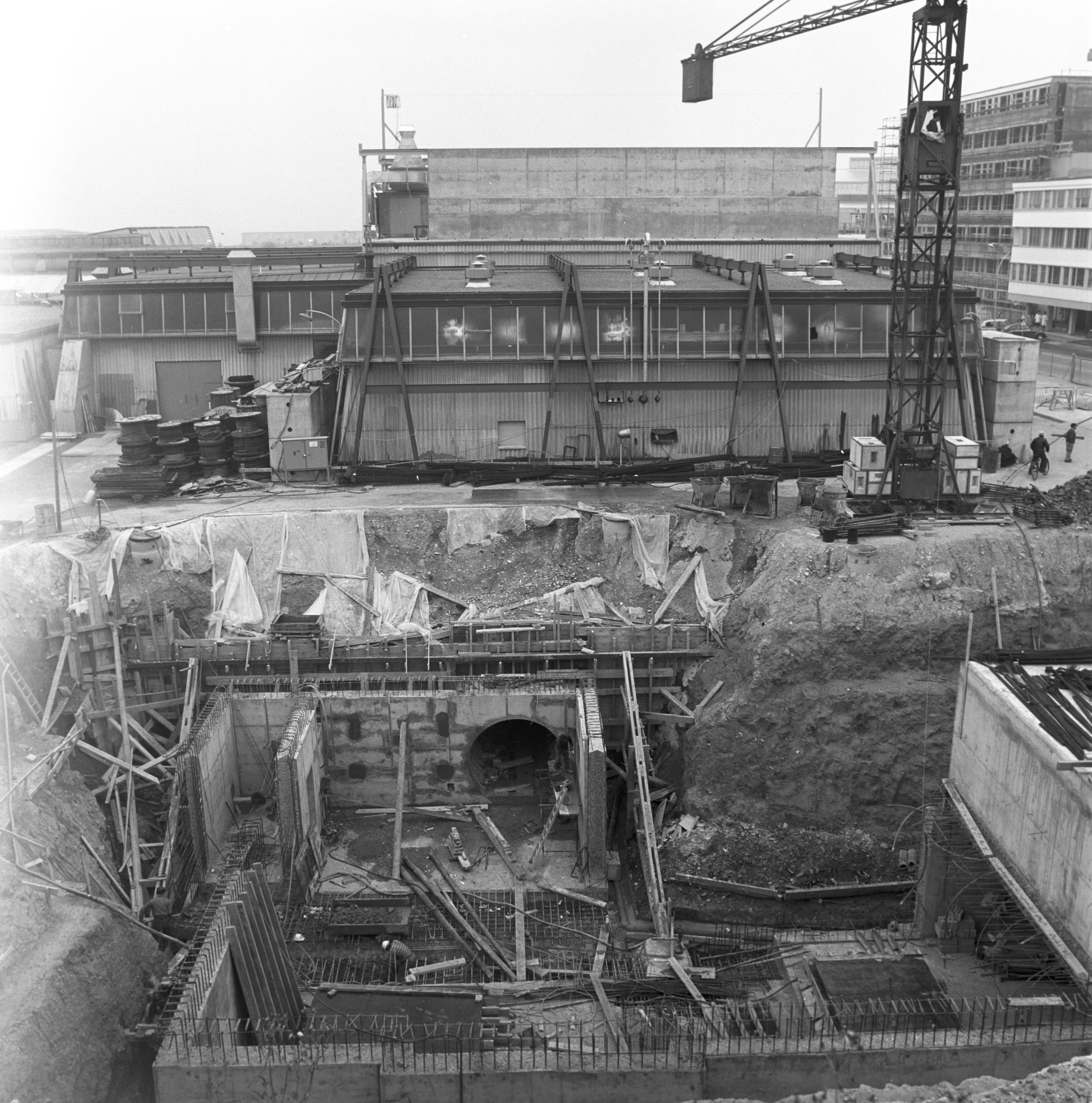
Excavation of underground experimental area for ISOLDE in 1966

In 1950, two Danish physicists Otto Kofoed-Hansen and Karl-Ove Nielsen discovered a new technique for producing radioisotopes which enabled production of isotopes with shorter half-lives than earlier methods. The Copenhagen experiment they carried out included a simplified version of the same elements used in modern on-line experiments. Ten years later, in Vienna, at a symposium about separating radioisotopes, plans for an 'on-line' isotope separator were published. Using these plans, CERN's Nuclear Chemistry Group (NCG) built a prototype on-line mass separator coupled to target and ion source, which was bombarded by a 600 MeV proton beam delivered by CERN's the Synchro-Cyclotron. The test was a success and showed that the SC was an ideal machine for on-line rare isotope production. The plan for an electromagnetic isotope separator was developed during 1963–4 by European nuclear physicists and, in late 1964, their proposal was accepted by the CERN Director-General and the ISOLDE project began.

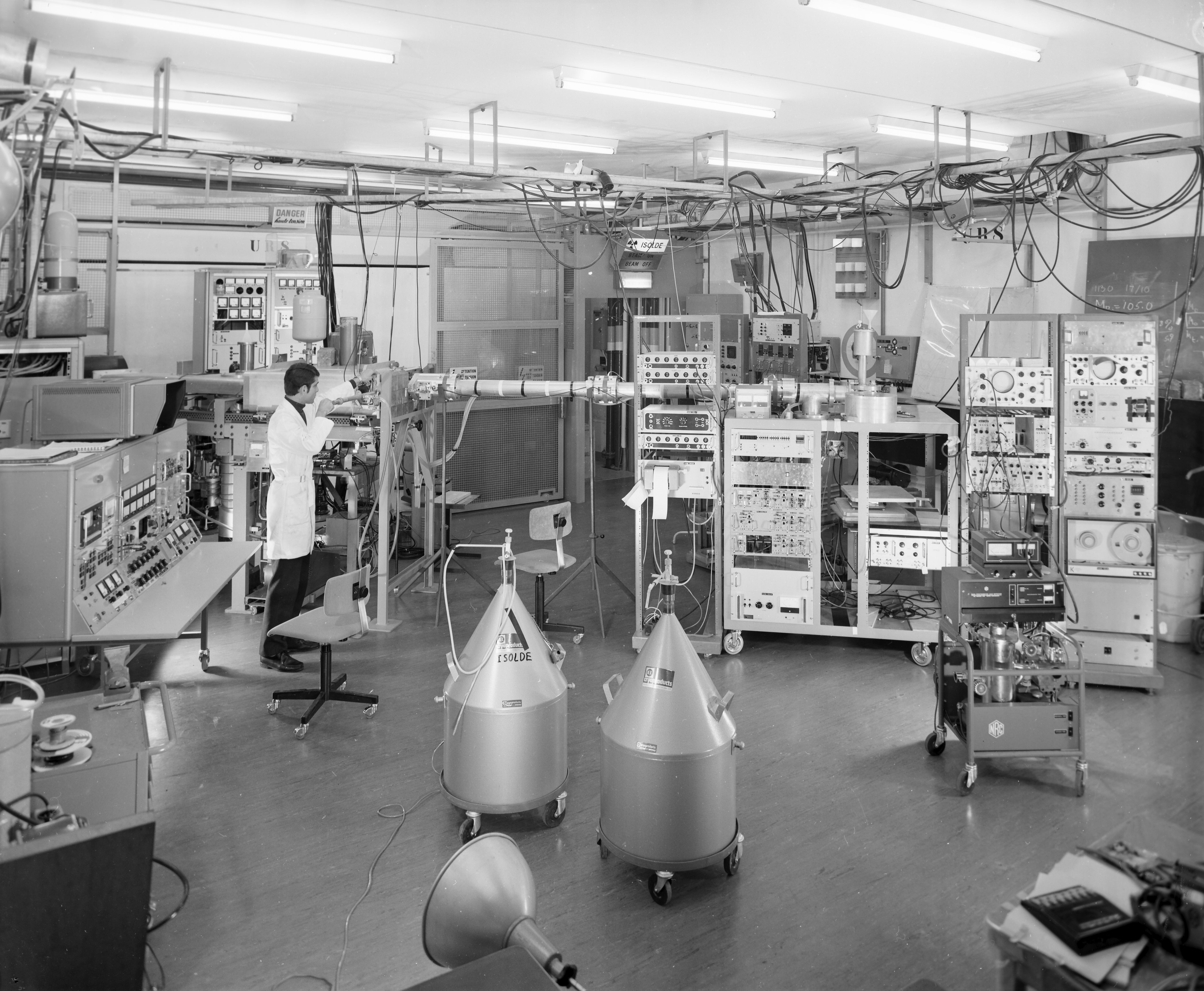
ISOLDE facility at CERN in 1968

The "Finance Committee" for the project set up originally with five members, then extended to twelve to include two members per 'country' (including CERN). As the term "Finance Committee" had other connotations, it was decided 'until a better name was found' to call the project ISOLDE and the committee the ISOLDE Committee. In 1965, as the underground hall at CERN was being excavated, the isotope separator for ISOLDE was being constructed in Aarhus. In May 1966, the SC shut down for some major modifications. One of these modifications was the construction of a new tunnel to send proton beams to a future underground hall that would be dedicated to ISOLDE. Separator construction made good progress in 1966, along with the appointing of Arve Kjelberg as the first ISOLDE coordinator, and the underground hall was finished in 1967. On 16 October 1967, the first proton beams interacted with the target and the first experiments were successful in proving that the technique worked as expected. In 1969, the first paper was published with studies of various short-lived isotopes.

Shortly after the ISOLDE experimental program started, some major improvements for SC were planned. In 1972 the SC shut down to upgrade its beam intensity by changing its radiofrequency system. The SC Improvement Program (SCIP) increased the primary proton beam intensity by about a factor of about 100. To be able to handle this high-intensity ISOLDE facility also needed some modifications to successfully extract the improved beam to ISOLDE. After necessary modifications, the new ISOLDE facility also known as ISOLDE 2 was launched in 1974. Its new target design combined with the increased beam intensity from the SC led to significant enhancements in the number of nuclides produced. However, after some time the external beam current from the SC started to be a limiting factor. The collaboration discussed the possibility of moving the facility to an accelerator that could reach higher current values but decided on building another separator with ultra-modern design, for the facility. The new high-resolution separator, ISOLDE 3, was in full use by the end of the 80s. In 1990 a new ion source RILIS was installed at the facility to selectively and efficiently produce radioactive beams.

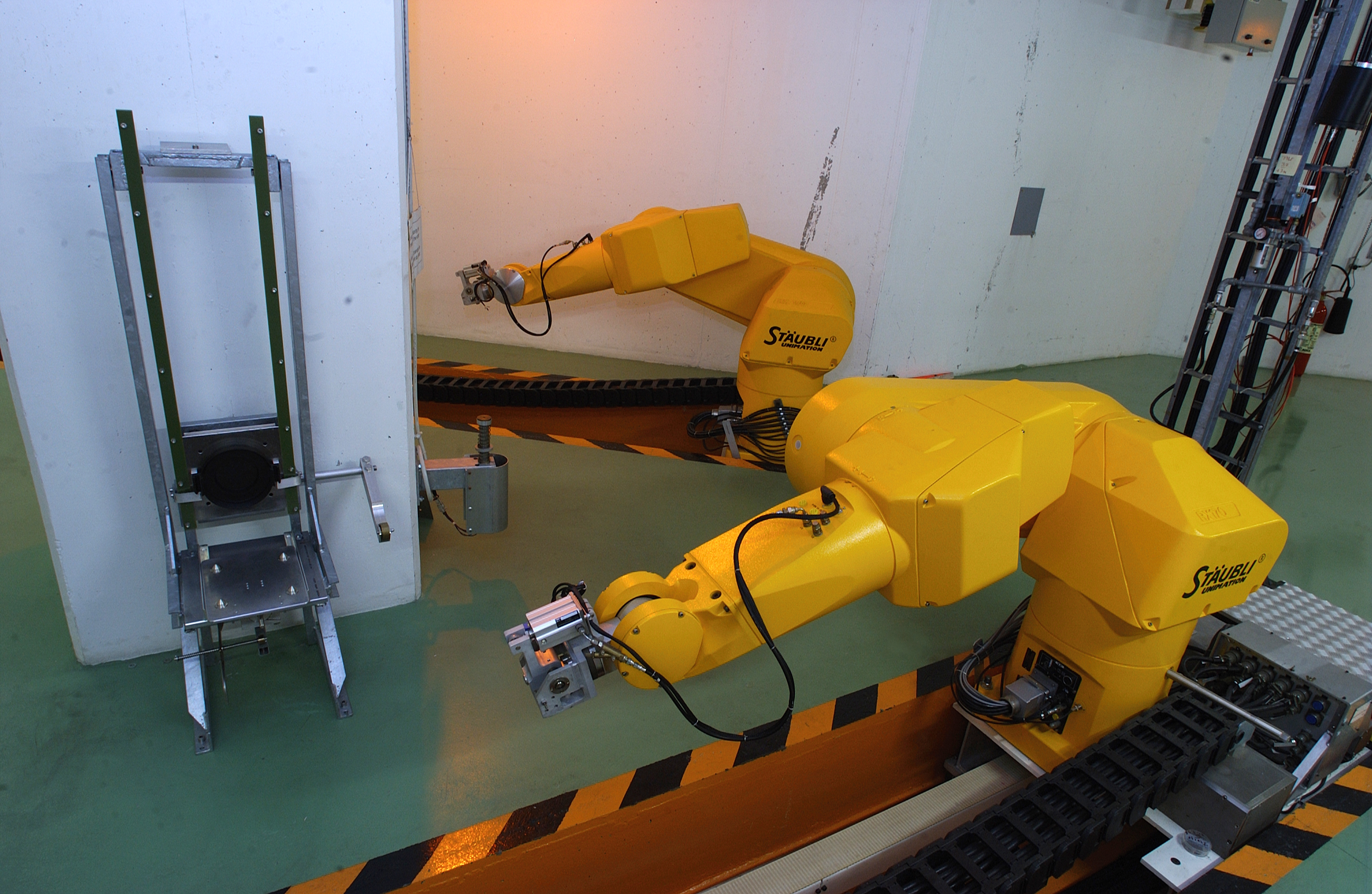
Industrial robots used in ISOLDE facility

The SC was decommissioned in 1990, after having been in operation for more than three decades. As a consequence, the collaboration decided to relocate the ISOLDE facility to the Proton Synchrotron, and place the targets in an external beam from its 1 GeV booster. The construction of the new ISOLDE experimental hall started about three months prior to the decommissioning of the SC. With the relocation also came several upgrades. The most notable being the installation of two new magnetic dipole mass separators. One general-purpose separator with one bending magnet and the other one is a high-resolution separator with two bending magnets. The latter one is a reconstructed version of the ISOLDE 3. The first experiment at the new facility, known as ISOLDE PSB, was performed on 26 June 1992. In May 1995, two industrial robots were installed in the facility to handle the targets and ion sources units without human intervention.

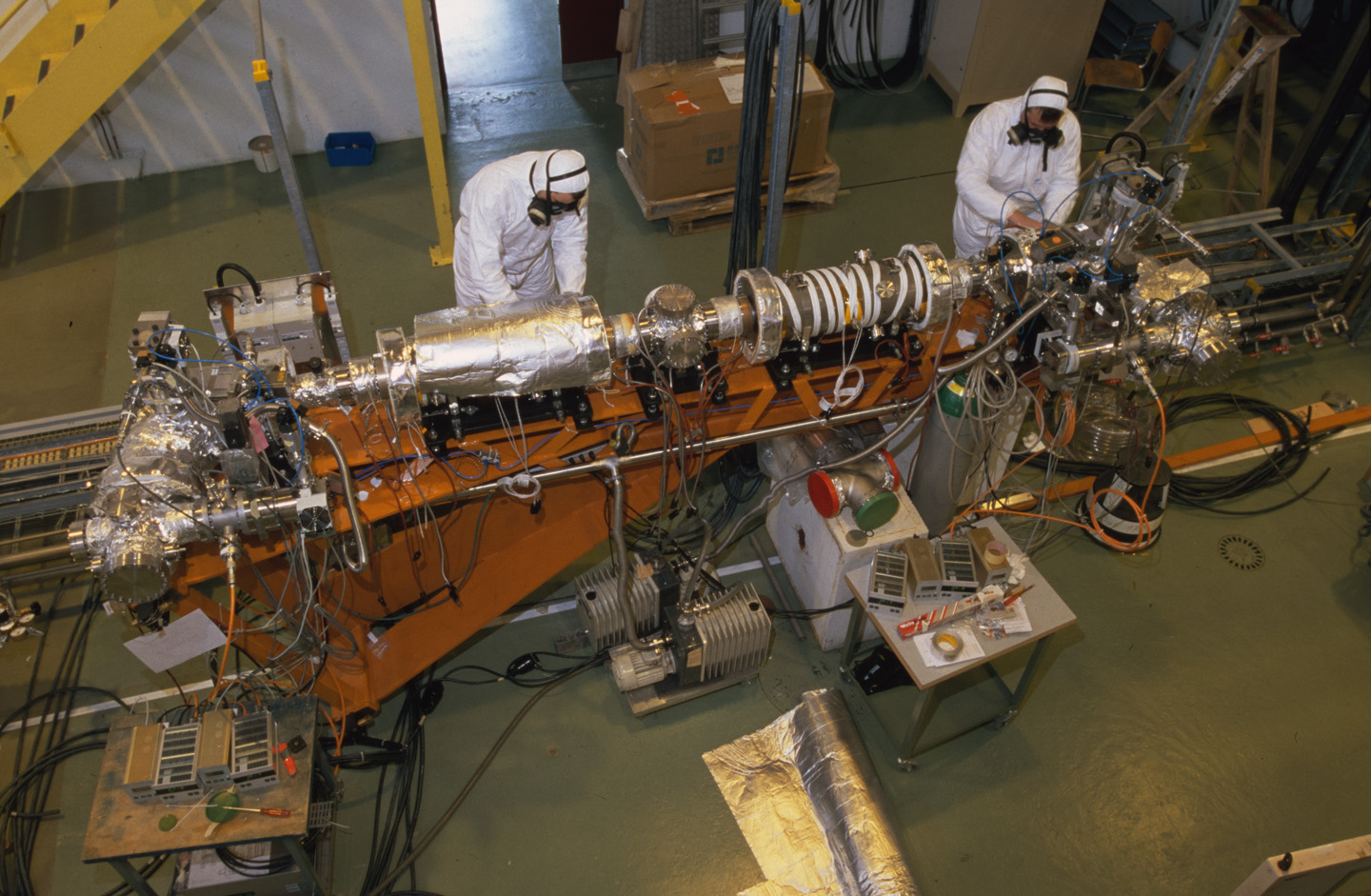
The new beam transfer line between REXTRAP and REXEBIS during the assembly

To diversify the scientific activities of the facility, a post-accelerator system called REX-ISOLDE (Radioactive beam EXperiments at ISOLDE) was approved in 1995 and inaugurated at the facility in 2001. With this new addition, nuclear reaction experiments which require a high-energy RIB could now be performed at ISOLDE. Additionally, REXTRAP operates as a Penning Trap for the REX-ISOLDE then transfers bunches of ions to REXEBIS, an Electron Beam Ion Source (EBIS), which traps the isotopes produced and further ionises them.

The facility building was extended in 2005 to allow more experiments to be set up. ISCOOL, an ion cooler and buncher, increasing the beam quality for experiments was installed at the facility in 2007. In 2006, the International Advisory Board decided that upgrading ISOLDE hall with a linear post-accelerator design based on superconducting quarter-wave resonators would allow for a full-energy availability, crucially without the reduction of beam quality. The HIE-ISOLDE project was approved in December 2009, and involves an upgrade of the energy range from 3 MeV per nucleon, to 5 MeV, and lastly to 10 MeV per nucleon. The design also incorporated an intensity upgrade to make best use of the delivered proton beams. The upgrade project was split into three different phases, to be completed over a number of years.

In late 2013 the construction of a new facility for medical research called CERN MEDICIS (MEDical Isotopes Collected from ISOLDE) started. Of the incident proton beams used at ISOLDE, only 10% are actually stopped in the targets and achieve their objective, while the remaining 90% are not used. The MEDICIS facility is designed to work with the remaining proton beams that have already passed a first target. The second target produces specific radioisotopes that are delivered to hospitals and research facilities and can be made injectable.

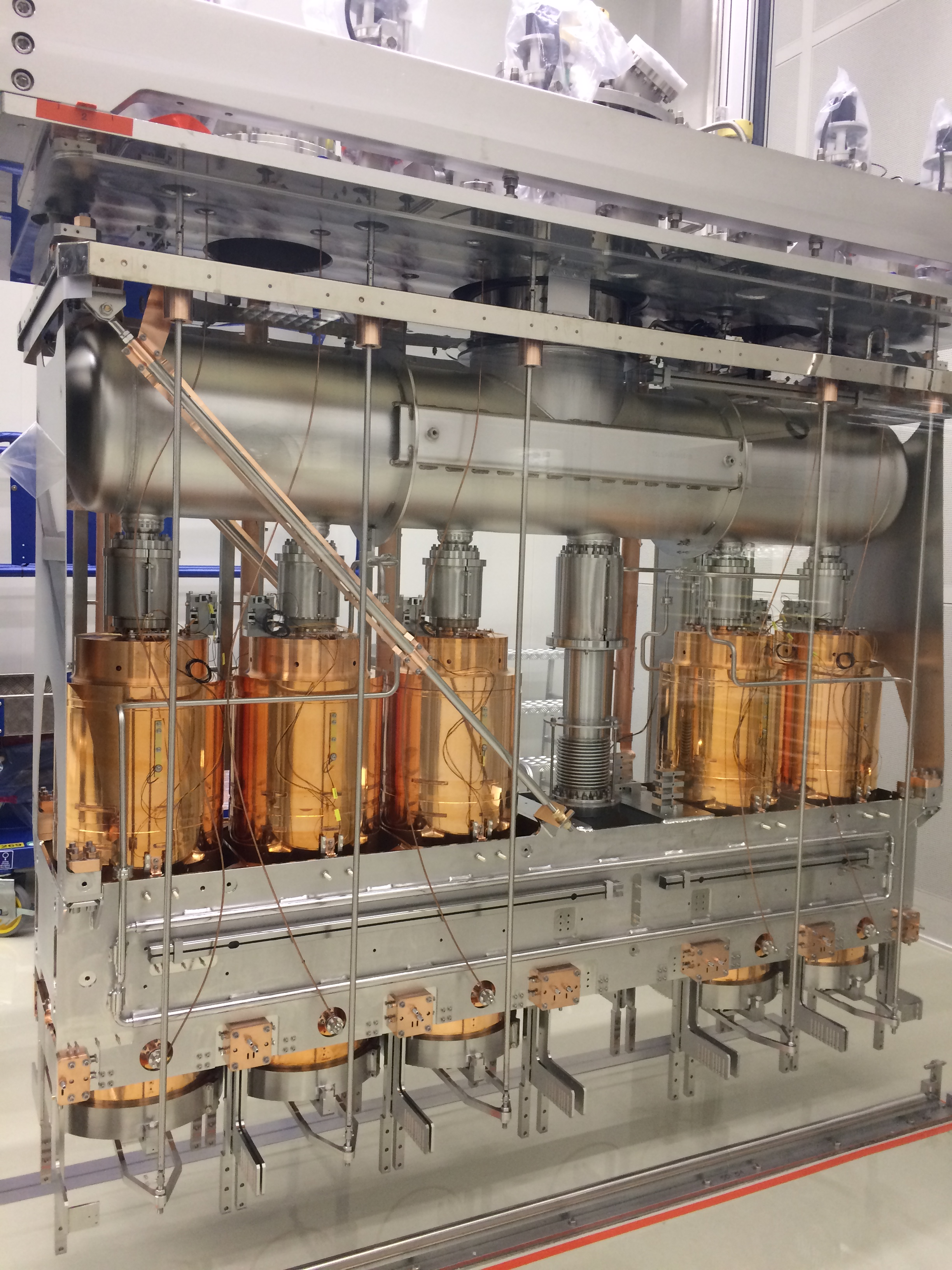
Cryo-module assembled in SM18 cleanroom for CERN's HIE-ISOLDE facility

In 2013, during the Long Shutdown 1, three ISOLDE buildings were demolished. They've been built again as a new single building with a new control room, a data storage room, three laser laboratories, a biology and materials laboratory, and a room for visitors. Another building extension for the MEDICIS project and several others equipped with electrical, cooling and ventilation systems to be used for the HIE-ISOLDE project in the future were also built. In addition, the robots which were installed for the handling of radioactive targets have been replaced with more modern robots. In 2015, for the first time, a radioactive isotope beam could be accelerated to an energy level of 4.3 MeV per nucleon in the ISOLDE facility thanks to the HIE-ISOLDE upgrades. In late 2017, the CERN-MEDICIS facility produced its first radioisotopes and by the end of 2020 had provided external nine hospitals and research facilities with 41 batches of radioisotopes. Phase 2 of the facility's HIE-ISOLDE upgrade was completed in 2018, which allows ISOLDE to accelerate radioactive beams up to 10 MeV per nucleon.

== Facility and concept ==
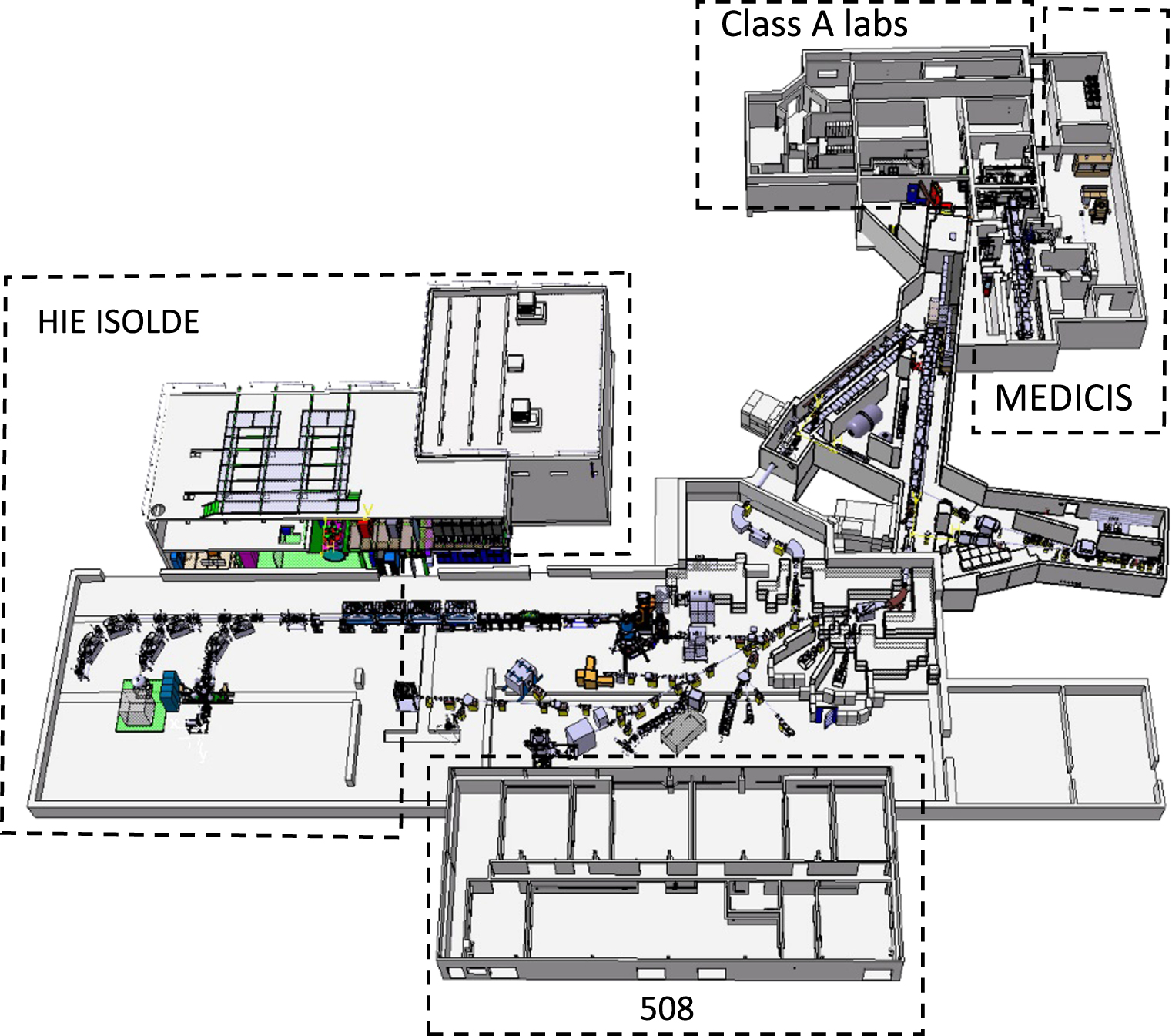
A model of ISOLDE facility (2017)

The ISOLDE facility contains the Class A laboratories, buildings for the HIE-ISOLDE and MEDICIS projects, and the control rooms located in building 508. Before ISOLDE, the radioactive nuclides were transported from the production are to the laboratory for examination. At ISOLDE, all processes from the production to the measurements are connected and the radioactive material requires no extra transport. Due to this, ISOLDE is referred to as an on-line facility.

At the ISOLDE facility, the main proton beam for reactions comes from the PSB. The incoming proton beam has an energy of 1.4 GeV and its average intensity varies up to 2 μA. The beam enters the facility and is directed towards one of two mass separators: the General Purpose Separator (GPS) and the High Resolution Separator (HRS). The separators have independently run target-ion source systems, delivering 60 keV RIBs.

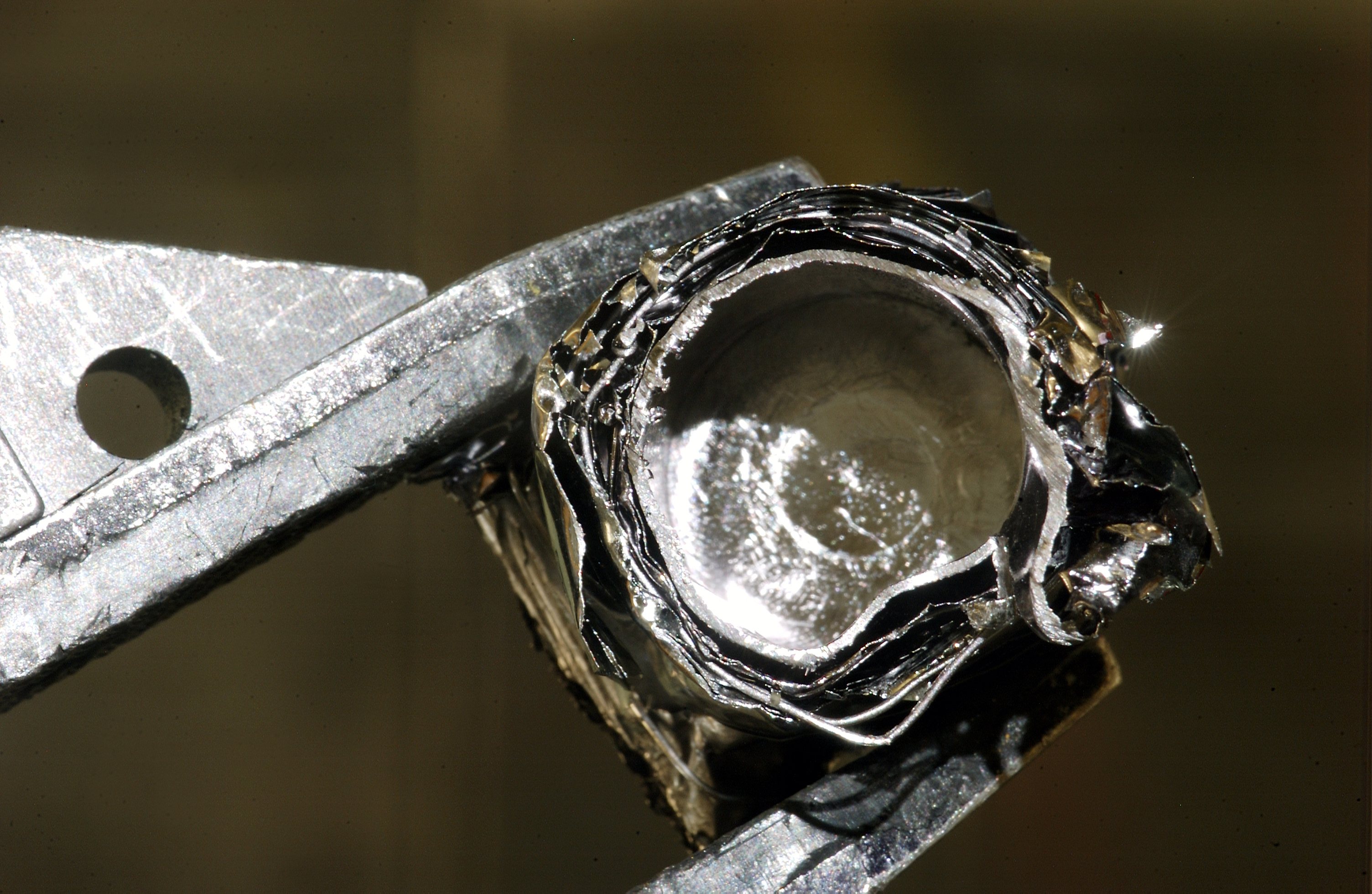
Irradiated ISOLDE tantalum-232 target

The targets used at ISOLDE allow for the quick production and extraction of radioactive nuclei. Targets consist sometimes of molten metal kept at high temperature (700 °C to 1400 °C), which result in long isotope release times. Heating the target to higher temperatures, typically above 2000 °C, makes for a faster release time. Using a target heavier than the desired isotope, results in production via spallation or fragmentation.

The ion sources, used in combination with the targets at ISOLDE, produce an ion beam of (preferably) one chemical element. There are three types used: surface ion sources, plasma ion sources and laser ion sources. The surface ion sources consist of a metal tube with a high work function heated up to 2400 °C, so that the atom can be ionised. If an atom cannot be surface ionised, the plasma ion source is used. The plasma is produced by an ionised gas mixture and optimised using an additional magnetic field. The laser ion source used at ISOLDE is RILIS.

The GPS is made with a double focusing magnet with a bending radius of 1.5 m and a bending angle of 70°. The resolution of the GPS is approximately 800. The GPS sends beams to an electronic switchyard, allowing three mass separated beams to be simultaneously extracted. The second separator, the HRS, consists of two dipole magnets, with bending radii of 1 m and bending angles of 90° and 60°, and an elaborate ion-optical system. The overall resolution of the HRS has been measured as 7000, which enables it to be used for experiments requiring higher mass resolution values. The GPS switchyard and HRS are connected to a common central beam-line used to provide beam to the various experimental setups located in the ISOLDE facility.

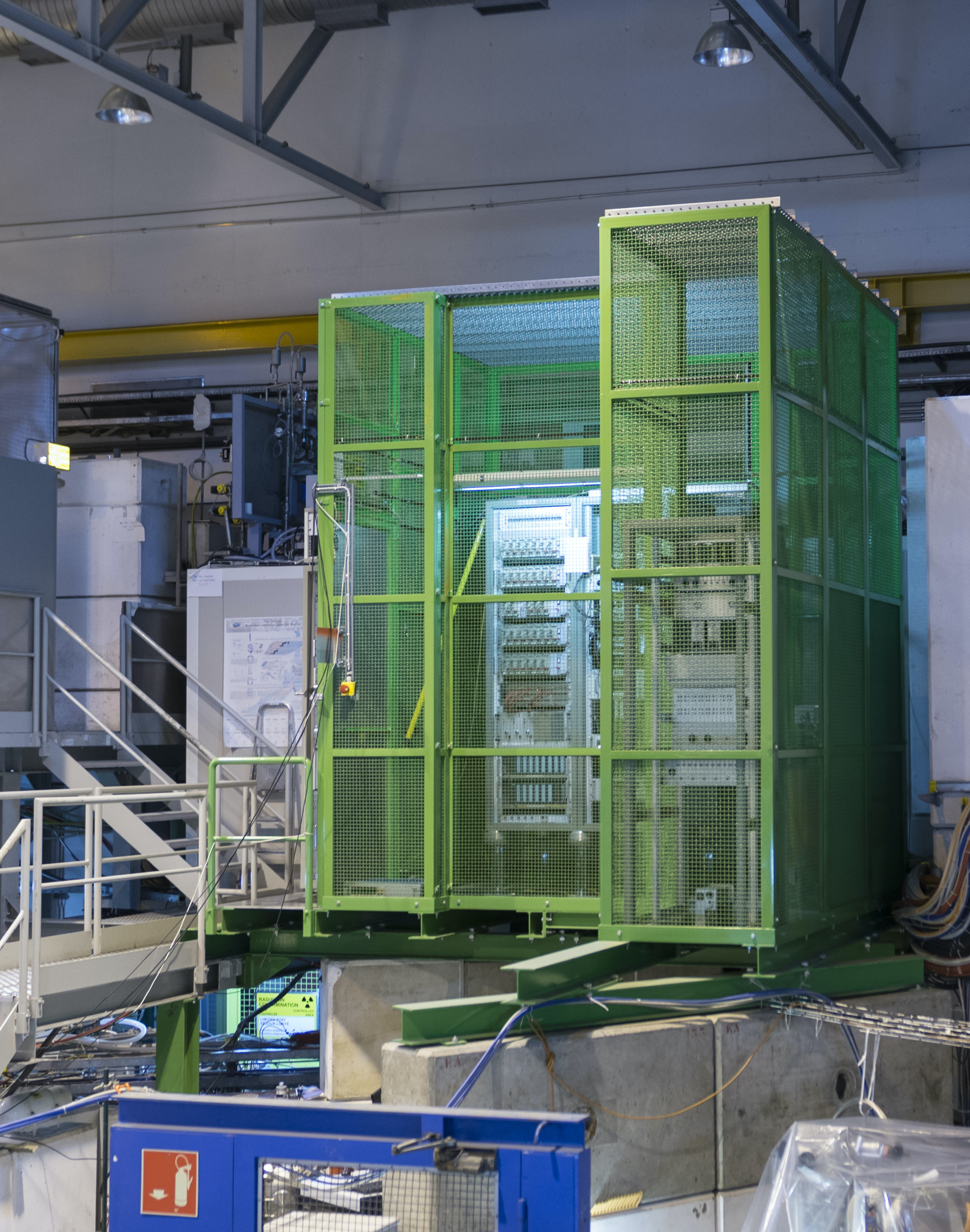
ISCOOL high voltage platform

=== ISCOOL ===
The ISOLDE COOLer (ISCOOL) is located downstream from the HRS, and extends up to the merging switchyard joining the two mass separator beams. ISCOOL is a general-purpose Radio Frequency Quadrupole Cooler and Buncher (RFQCB), with the purpose of cooling (improving the beam quality) and bunching the RIB from the HRS. Incoming ions collide with the neutral buffer gas, losing their energy, and then are radially confined. The beam is then extracted from ISCOOL.

=== RILIS ===
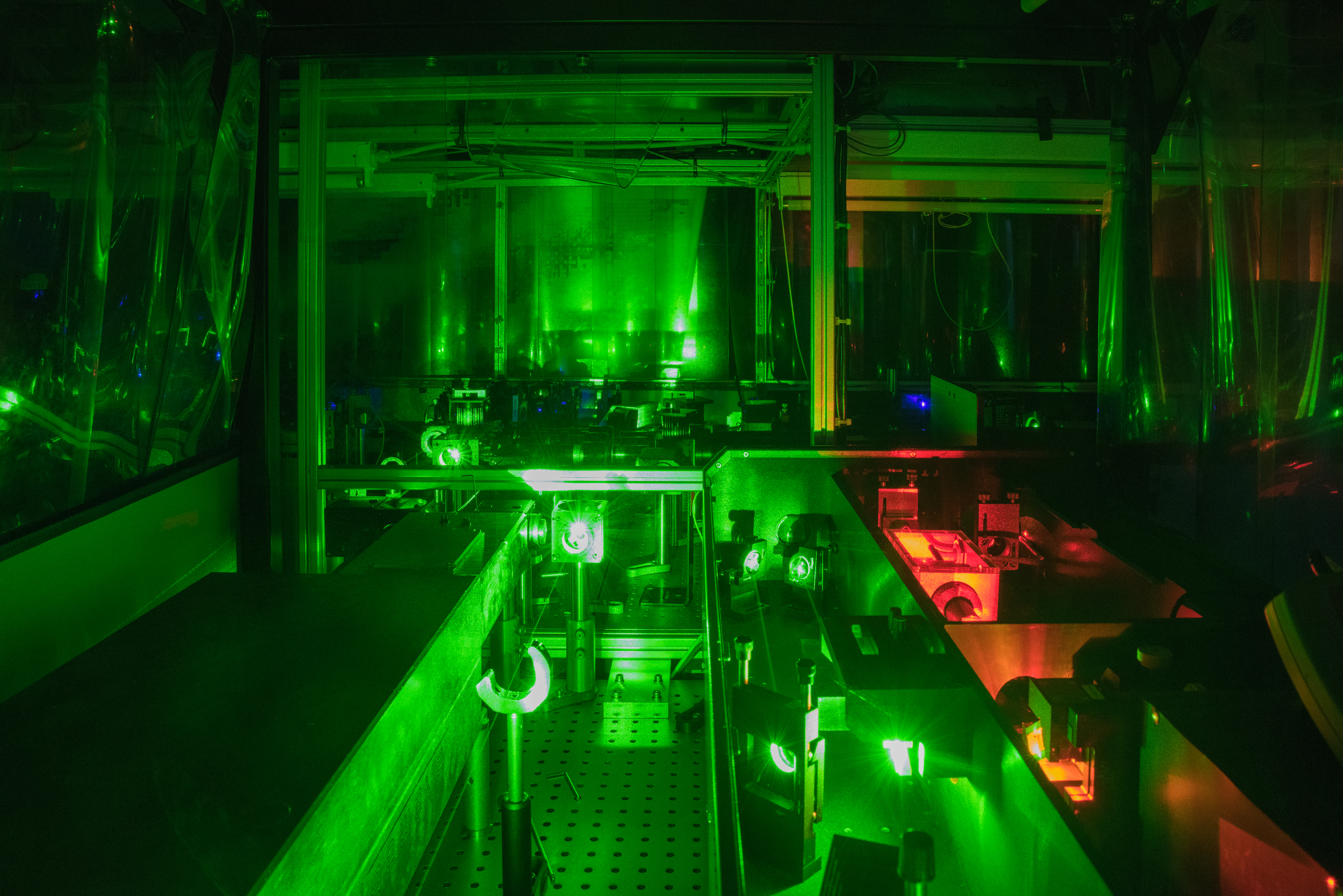
RILIS setup at ISOLDE

The magnetic mass separators are able to separate isobars by mass number, however they are unable to sort isotopes of the same mass. If an experiment requires a higher degree of chemical purity, it will need the beam to have an additional separation, by proton number. RILIS provides this separation by using step-wise resonance photo-ionisation, involving precisely tuned laser wavelengths matched exactly to a specific element's successive electron transition energies. Ionisation will only occur of the desired element, and the other elements within the ion-source will remain unchanged. This process of laser ionisation takes place in a hot metal cavity to provide the spatial confinement needed for the atomic vapour to be illuminated. A high frequency laser system is needed to ionise the atom before it leaves the cavity. All in all, the ISOLDE facility provides 1300 isotopes from 75 elements in the periodic table.

=== CERN-MEDICIS ===
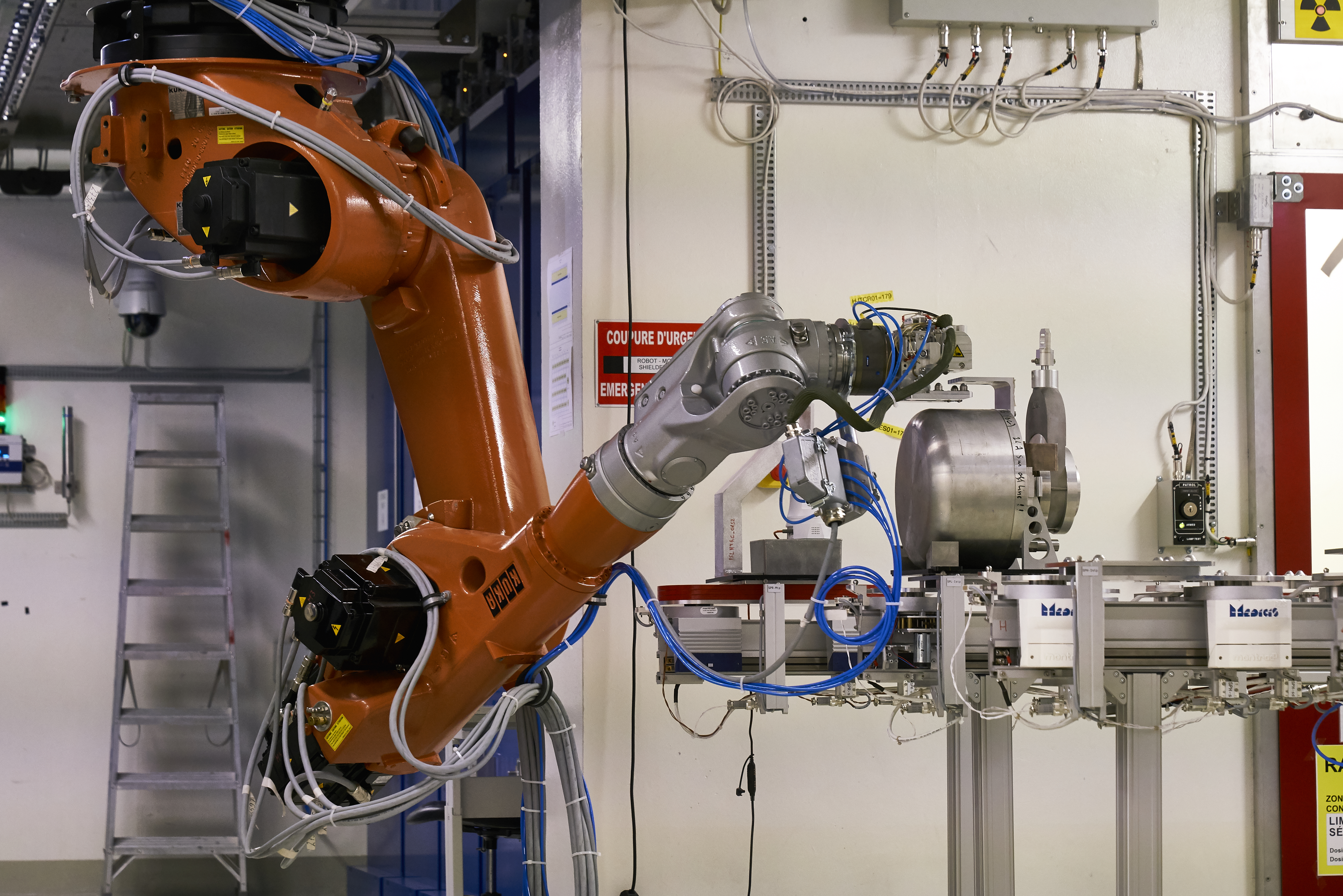
MEDICIS robot isotope production for medical research

The project CERN-MEDICIS is running to supply radioactive isotopes for medical applications. The proton beams from the PSB preserve 90% of their intensities after hitting a standard target in the facility. The CERN-MEDICIS facility uses the remaining protons on a target that is placed behind the HRS target, in order to produce radioisotopes for medical purposes. The irradiated target is then carried to the MEDICIS building by using an automated conveyor to separator and collect the isotopes of interest.

=== REX-ISOLDE ===
The post-accelerator REX-ISOLDE is a combination of different devices used to accelerate radioisotopes to boost their energy to 10 MeV per nucleon, increased from 3 MeV per nucleon due to HIE-ISOLDE upgrades. The incoming RIBs have enough energy to overcome the first potential threshold of the Penning trap, REXTRAP, but within the trap the ions lose energy through collisions with buffer gas atoms. This cools the ions and their movement is dampened by a combination of a radio-frequency (RF) excitation and a buffer gas. The ion bunches are extracted from REXTRAP and injected into REXEBIS.

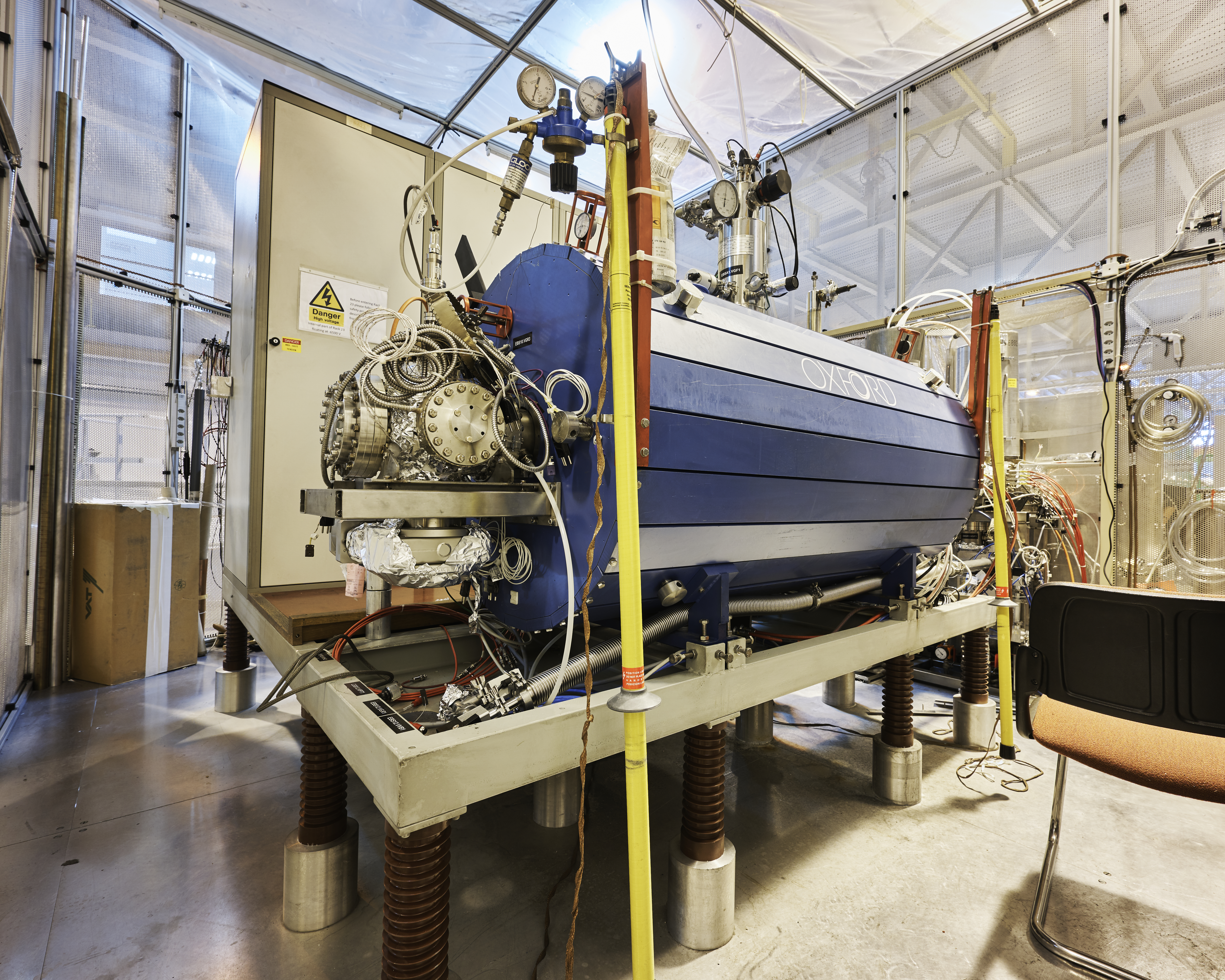
REXEBIS, the Electron Beam Ion Source, at ISOLDE

REXEBIS uses a strong magnetic field to focus electrons from an electron gun in order to produce highly charged ions. The ions are confined radially and longitudinally, after which they will undergo stepwise ionisation through electron impact. A mass separator is required to separator the subsequent ions, due to the small intensity after being extracted from EBIS.

The next stage of REX-ISOLDE consists of a normal conducting (room-temperature) linac, where the ions are accelerated by an RFQ. An interdigital H-type (IH) structure uses resonators to boost the beam energy up to its maximum value.

REX-ISOLDE was originally intended to accelerate light isotopes, but has passed this goal and provided post-accelerated beams of a wider mass range, from ^{6}He up to ^{224}Ra. The post-accelerator has delivered accelerated beams of more than 100 isotopes and 30 elements since its commissioning.

=== HIE-ISOLDE upgrades ===
To be able to satisfy the ever-increasing needs of higher quality, intensity, and energy of the production beam is very important for facilities such as ISOLDE. As the latest response to satisfy these needs, HIE-ISOLDE upgrade project is currently ongoing. Due to its phased planning, the upgrade project is being carried out with the least impact on the experiments continuing in the facility. The project included an energy increase for the REX-ISOLDE up to 10 MeV as well as resonator and cooler upgrades, enhancement of the input beam from PSB, improvements on targets, ion sources, and mass separators. Following the completion of the phase two upgrade in 2018 for the HIE-ISOLDE which included installing four high-beta cryomodules, the next and final phase will replace REX structures after the IH-structure (IHS) with two low-beta cryomodules. This will improve the beam quality and allow a continuously variable energy between 0.45 and 10 MeV per nucleon. As a state-of-the-art project, HIE-ISOLDE is expected to expand the research opportunities in ISOLDE facility to the next level. When completed, the upgraded facility will be able to host advanced experiments in fields like nuclear physics and nuclear astrophysics.

== Experimental setups ==
ISOLDE contains both temporary and fixed experimental setups. Temporary setups in the ISOLDE facility are there for shorter time periods, and generally focus on detecting specific decay modes of nuclei. The fixed experimental setups have a permanent position at the facility. They include:

=== COLLAPS ===
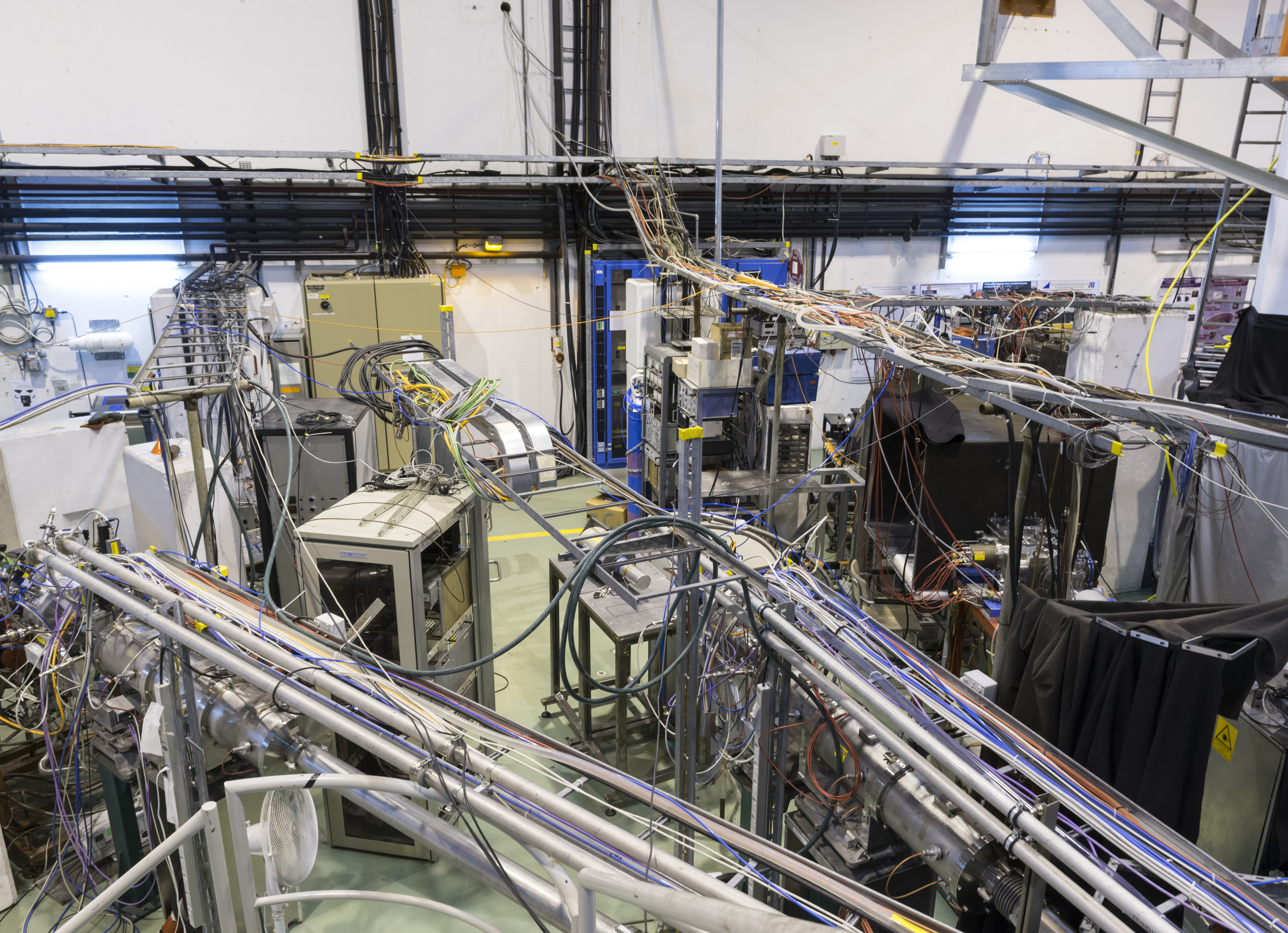
COLLAPS experiment and spectroscopy beam lines in the ISOLDE facility at CERN

The COLinear LAser SPectroScopy (COLLAPS) experiment has been operating at ISOLDE since the late 1970s and is the oldest active experiment at the facility. COLLAPS studies ground and isomeric state properties of highly-unstable (exotic), short-lived nuclei, including measurements of their spins, electro-magnetic moments and charge radii. The experiment uses the technique of collinear spectroscopy using lasers to access necessary atomic transitions.

=== CRIS ===
The Collinear Resonance Ionization Spectroscopy (CRIS) experiment uses fast beam collinear laser spectroscopy alongside the technique of resonance ionization to produce results with a high resolution and efficiency. The experiment studies group-state properties of exotic nuclei and produces isomeric beams used for decay studies.

=== EC-SLI ===
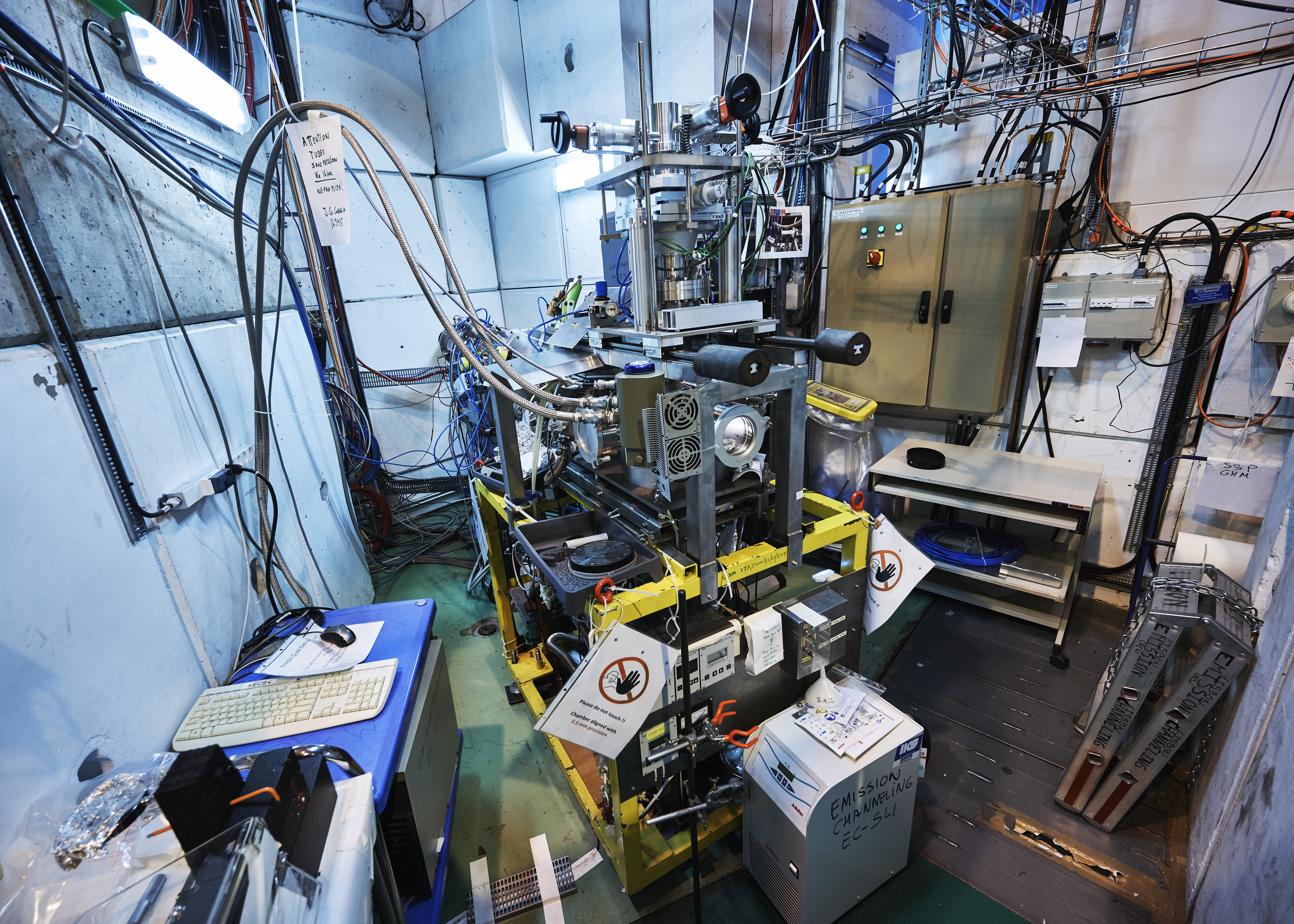
The EC-SLI experiment at ISOLDE

The Emission Channeling with Short-Lived Isotopes (EC-SLI) experiment uses the emission channelling method to study lattice locations of dopants and impurities in crystals and epitaxial thin films. This is done by introducing short-lived isotope probes into the crystal and measuring the electron intensity affected to determine whether they have been affected by the decay particles emitted.

=== IDS ===
The ISOLDE Decay Station (IDS) experiment is a setup that allows different experiment systems to be coupled to the station, using spectroscopy techniques such as fast timing or time-of-flight (ToF). The station, operational since 2014, is used to measure decay properties of a wide range of radioactive isotopes for a variety of applications. Results from the IDS have been useful for astrophysics, as they measured the probability of a particular decay seen in red giant stars.

=== ISS ===
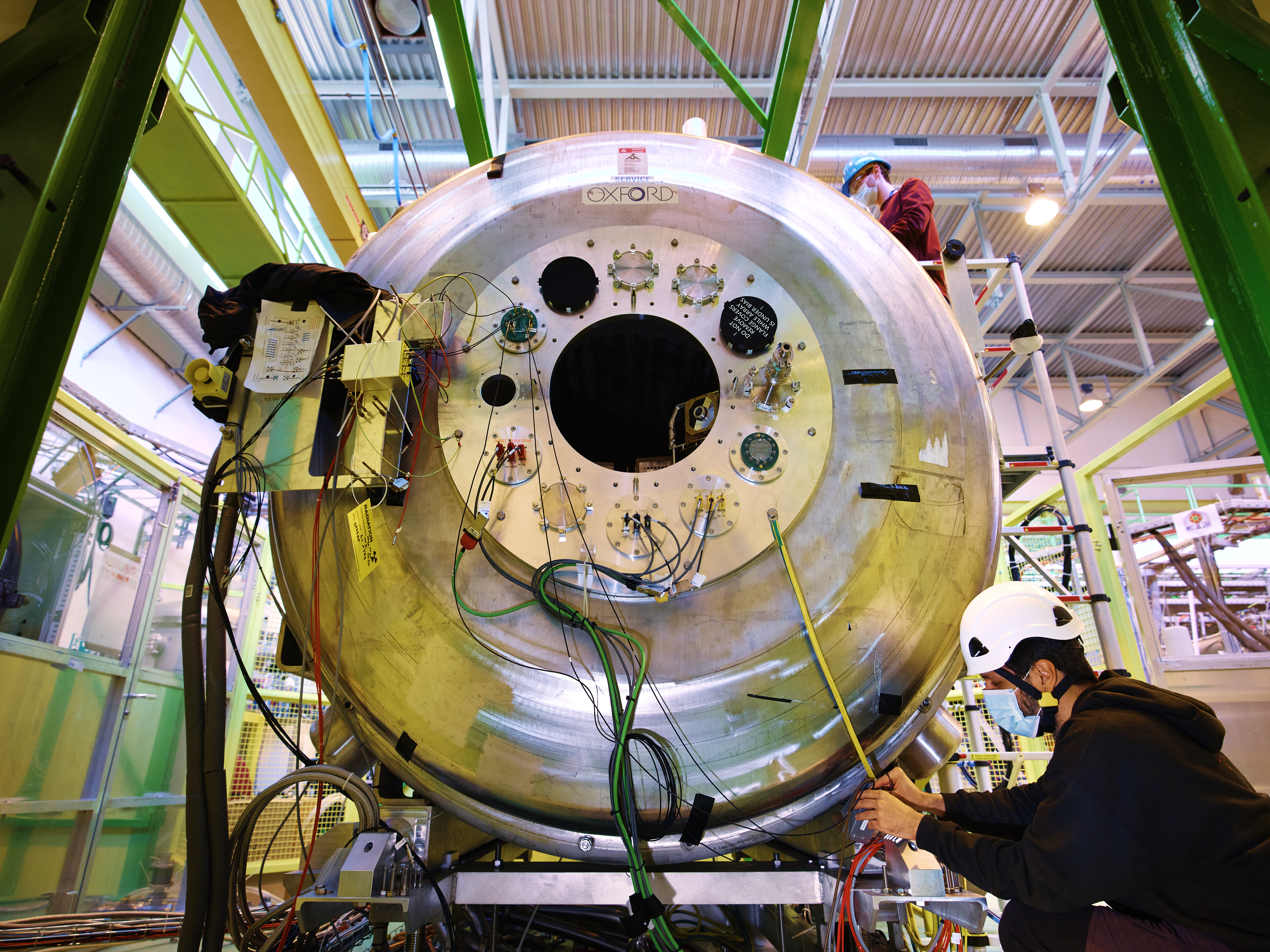
Ex-MRI magnet used for the ISS experiment

The ISOLDE Solenoidal Spectrometer (ISS) experiment uses an ex-MRI magnet to direct RIBs at a light target. Conditions produced by this reaction replicate those present in astrophysical processes, and measuring the properties of the atomic nuclei will also provide a better understanding of nucleon-nucleon interactions in exotic nuclei. The experiment was commissioned in 2021 and finished construction during the Long Shutdown 2.

=== ISOLTRAP ===
The ISOLTRAP experiment is a high-precision mass spectrometer that uses the ToF detection technique to measure mass. Since the start of its operation, ISOLTRAP has measured the mass of hundreds of short-lived radioactive nuclei, as well as confirming the existence of doubly magic isotopes. The setup was upgraded in 2011 to include a multi-reflection time-of-flight mass spectrometer (MR-ToF), allowing the detection of more exotic isotopes.

=== LUCRECIA ===
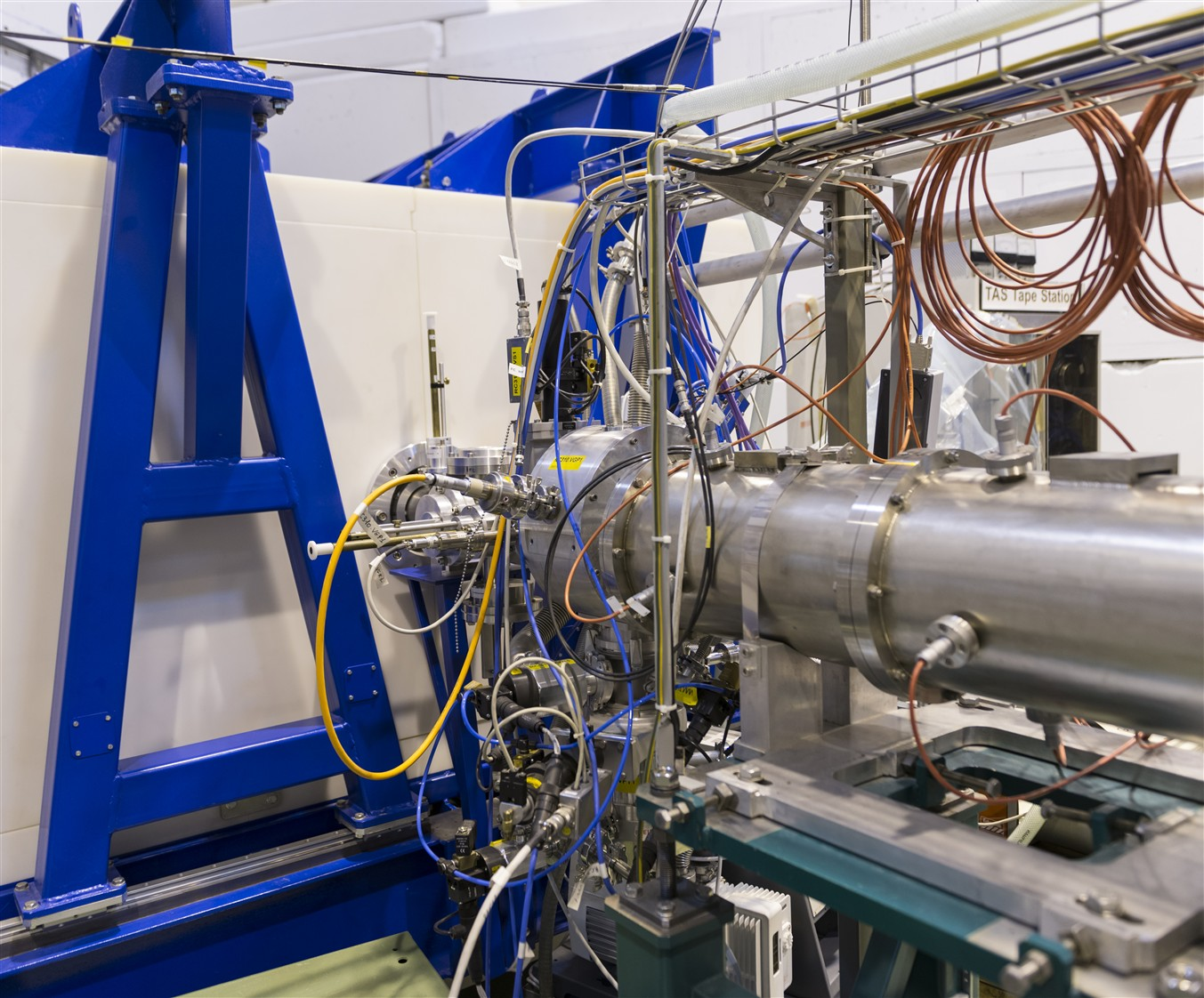
LUCRECIA - the total absorption spectrometer (TAS) at ISOLDE

The LUCRECIA experiment is based on a Total Absorption gamma Spectrometer (TAS), which measures the gamma transitions in an unstable parent nucleus. From these measurements, nuclear structure is analysed and used to confirm theoretical models and make stellar predictions.

=== Miniball ===
The Miniball experiment is a gamma-ray spectroscopy setup consisting of a high-resolution germanium detector array. The experiment is used to analyse the decays of short-lived nuclei involved in Coulomb excitation and transfer reactions. Results from Miniball at ISOLDE that found evidence of pear-shaped heavy nuclei was named in the Institute of Physics (IoP) "top 10 breakthroughs in physics".

=== MIRACLS ===
MR-ToF Mirrors of the MIRACLS Experiment

The Multi Ion Reflection Apparatus for CoLlinear Spectroscopy (MIRACLS) experiment determines properties exotic radioisotopes by measuring their hyperfine structure. MIRACLS uses laser spectrometer on ion bunches trapped in a MR-ToF, to increase the flight path of the ions. Currently, the experiment is being designed and constructed.

=== SEC ===
The Scattering Experiments Chamber (SEC) experiment facilitates diversified reaction experiments, and is complimentary to the ISS and Miniball, due to SEC not detecting gamma radiation. The station is used to study low-lying resonances in light atomic nuclei through transfer reactions.

=== VITO ===
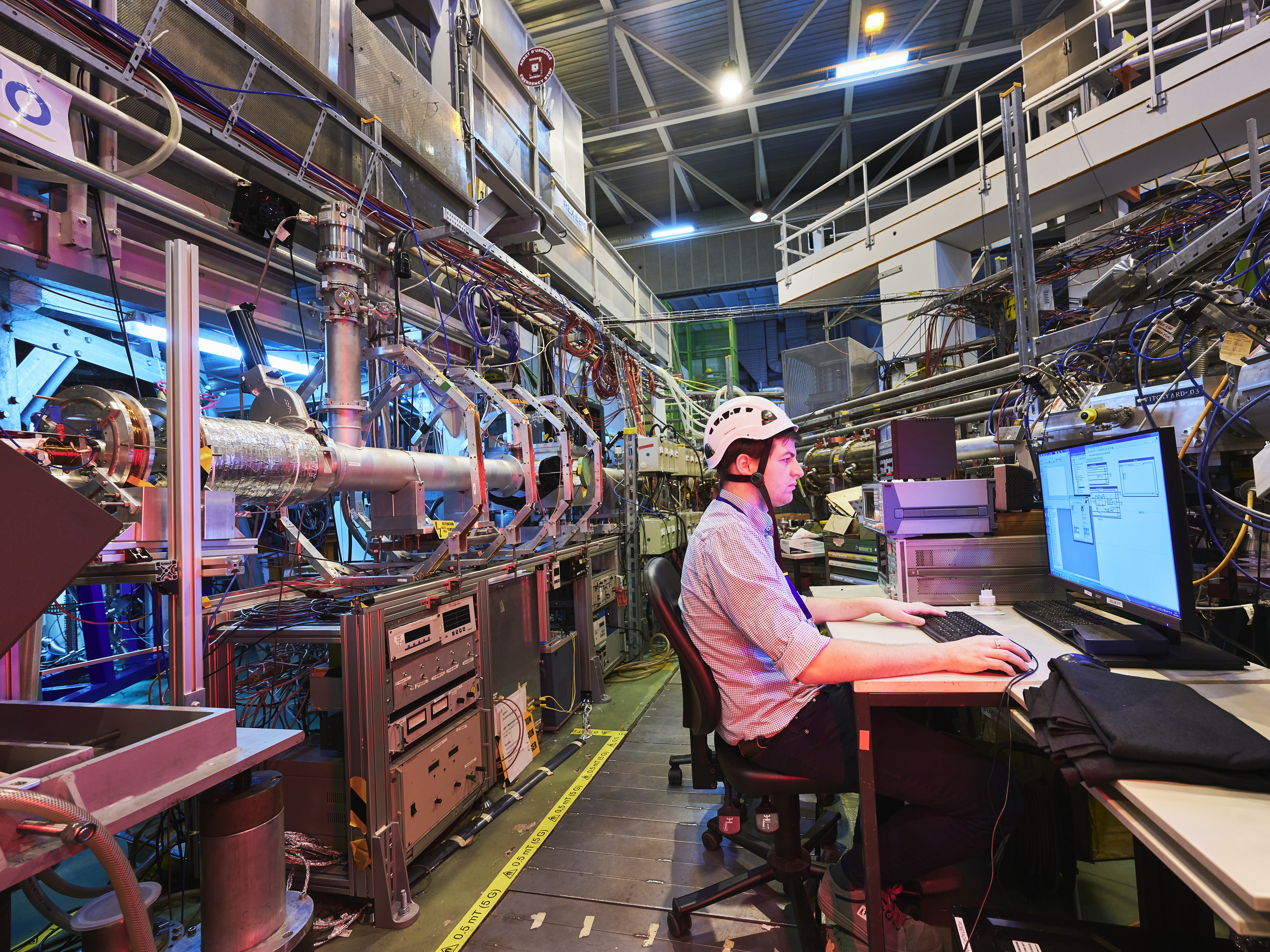
The VITO beamline area in the ISOLDE facility

The Versatile Ion polarisation Technique Online (VITO) experiment is a beamline used to investigate the weak interaction and determine properties of short-lived unstable nuclei. The experiment uses the technique of optical pumping to produce laser-polarised RIBs allowing for versatile studies. There are three independent studies on the VITO beamline including a β-NMR spectroscopy station.

=== WISArD ===
The Weak Interaction Studies with 32Ar Decay (WISArD) experiment investigates the weak interaction to search for physics beyond the Standard Model (SM). The WISArD setup reuses some of the WITCH experiment's infrastructure, as well as its superconducting magnet. The experiment measures the angular correlation between particles emitted by a parent and daughter nucleus to calculate non-SM contributions.

== Solid-state physics laboratory ==
Attached to ISOLDE in building 508, is CERN's solid-state physics laboratory. Solid state physics research (SSP) accounts for 10–15% of the yearly allocation of beam time and uses about 20–25% of the overall number of experiments running at ISOLDE. The laboratory uses the technique of Time Differential Perturbed Angular Correlation (TDPAC) to probe the large quantity of available radioactive elements provided by ISOLDE. This technique has also been used to measure ferromagnetic and ferroelectric properties of materials, as well as providing ion beams for other facilities within ISOLDE. Additional methods used for SSP are tracer diffusion, online-Mössbauer spectroscopy (^{57}Mn) and photoluminescence with radioactive nuclei.

== Beamline installations ==
The HIE-ISOLDE project introduced a network of High Energy Beam Transfer (HEBT) beamlines to the ISOLDE facility. The common section beamline, XT00, joins to three bending beamlines (XT01, XT02, XT03) leading to different experiment setups. The three identical beamlines are independent of each other, for example, if the first XT01 dipole magnet is off, the beam will continue to the XT02 and XT03. They all bend the beam by 90 degrees and focus it using two dipole magnets and a doublet-quadrupole. The XT01 beamline leads to Miniball, the XT02 beamline leads to the ISS, and the XT03 beamline leads to movable setups, such as the SEC scattering chamber.

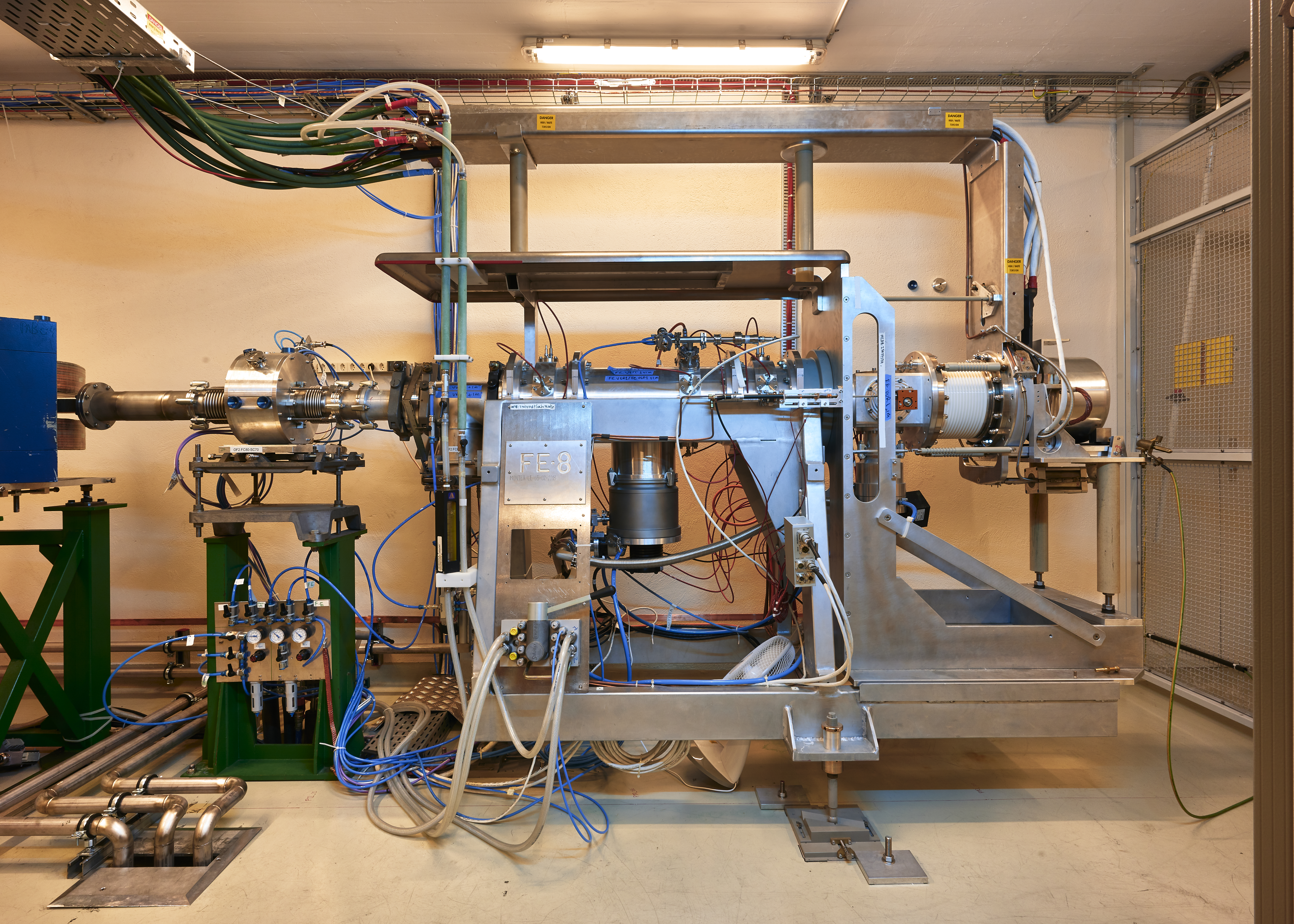
ISOLDE's Offline 2

Offline 2 was recently installed as a mass separator beamline at ISOLDE, with the purpose of satisfying the increased demands on the original offline facility, Offline 1. The facility includes the beamline enclosed in a Faraday cage as well as a laser laboratory and control station. The offline facility is designed for target test studies, and upgraded to include potential for the production and study of molecular ion beams.

== Results and discoveries ==
Below is the list of some physics activities done at ISOLDE facility.

- Extension of the table of nuclides by discovering new isotopes

The ISOLDE facility continuously develops the nuclear chart, and was the first to study structural evolution in long chains of noble gas, alkali elements and mercury isotopes.

- High precision measurements of nuclear masses

The ISOLTRAP experimental setup Is able to make high precision measurements of nuclear masses by using a series of Penning traps. The experiment has been able to measure isotopes with very short half-lives (<100 ms) with a precision of below 10^{−8}. For his work on "key contributions to the masses..." of isotopes at ISOLTRAP, among other work, Heinz-Jürgen Kluge was a recipient of the Lise Meitner Prize in 2006.

- Discovery of shape staggering in light Hg isotopes

Atomic nuclei are usually spherical, however gradual changes in nuclear shape can occur when the number of neutrons of a given element changes. Research published in 1971 showed that if single neutrons are added to or removed from the nuclei of mercury isotopes, the shape will change to a "rugby ball". Newer studies, from RILIS, show that this shape staggering also occurs with bismuth isotopes.

- Contributions to island of inversion measurements and potential discovery of new magic numbers

The island of inversion is a region of the chart of nuclides in which isotopes have enhanced stability, compared to the surrounding unstable nuclei. The island is associated with the magic neutron numbers (N = 8, 14, 20, 28, 50, 82, 126), where this breakdown occurs. Various experiments at ISOLDE have determined properties of these island of inversion isotopes, including the first of their kind measurements performed with Miniball on magnesium-32, lying in the island of inversion at N = 20. Furthermore, the ISOLTRAP experiment provided results using calcium-52 to reveal a potential new magic number, 32, which was later disproven by the CRIS experiment.

- Production of isomeric beams

A nuclear isomer is a metastable state of a nucleus, in which one or more nucleons occupy higher energy levels than in the ground state of the same nucleus. In the mid-2000s, REX-ISOLDE developed a technique to select and post-accelerate isomeric beams to use in nuclear-decay experiments, such as at Miniball.

- Production of gold

In 2022, the RILIS, Windmill and ISOLTRAP teams reported producing 18 gold nuclei from proton bombardment of a uranium target.

- Discovery of beta-delayed multi-particle emission

The first observation of beta-delayed two-neutron emission was made at ISOLDE in 1979, using the isotope lithium-11. Beta-delayed emission occurs for isotopes further away from the line of stability, and involves particle emission after beta decay. Newer studies have been proposed to investigate beta-delayed multi-particle emission of lithium-11 using the IDS.

- Studies on nuclear resonance systems beyond the drip line and existence of halo structure

The nuclear drip line is the boundary beyond which adding nucleons to a nucleus will result in the immediate decay of a nucleon (nucleon has 'dripped' out of the nucleus). Accelerated RIBs from REX-ISOLDE are used in transfer reactions which allow for studies of nuclear resonance systems beyond the dripline.

Some light nuclei close to the drip line may have a neutron halo structure, due to the tunnelling of loosely bound neutrons outside the nucleus. This proof of the halo structure was made at ISOLDE from a series of experiments analysing the lithium-11 nucleus.

- First observations of short-lived pear-shaped atomic nuclei

Research conducting using the Miniball experimental setup found evidence of pear-shaped heavy nuclei, in particular radon-220 and radium-224. These results were named in the Institute of Physics (IoP) "top 10 breakthroughs in physics" in 2013, and was featured as the cover of Nature 2013. In 2020, due to the HIE-ISOLDE upgrade, radium-222 was also found to have a "stable pear shape". Laser spectroscopy has been performed on a short-lived radioactive molecule, containing radium, which further studies into could reveal physics beyond the Standard Model due to time-reversal symmetry breaking.

- Measurement of ^{229m}Th transition energy

In 2023, ISOLDE made the first 1%-level measurement of the ultralow-energy thorium-229m nuclear isomer, detecting photons at an energy of 8.338±0.024 eV. This was a key step in the construction of a future nuclear clock.

== Improvements and future work ==
Below is a list of improvements needed for the ISOLDE facility, considering both medium and long-term goals. Some of these improvements have been proposed by the EPIC project.

=== Medium-term ===
- Parallel RIBs operation
- New beam dumps for the two target stations will give a proton beam at higher energy and double intensity
- Phase 3 upgrade to the HIE-ISOLDE post-accelerator to increase energy beyond 10 MeV per nucleon
- Upgrade of transfer line from the PSB

=== Long-term ===
- Addition of a storage ring with the capabilities to store short-lived isotopes
- A new HRS with a higher resolving power
- New ISOLDE building
- Installation of two extra target stations

== See also ==
- Eurisol
- Total absorption spectroscopy
- Facility for Rare Isotope Beams
- Rare Isotope Science Project
