= Resonance-enhanced multiphoton ionization =

Spectroscopy technique

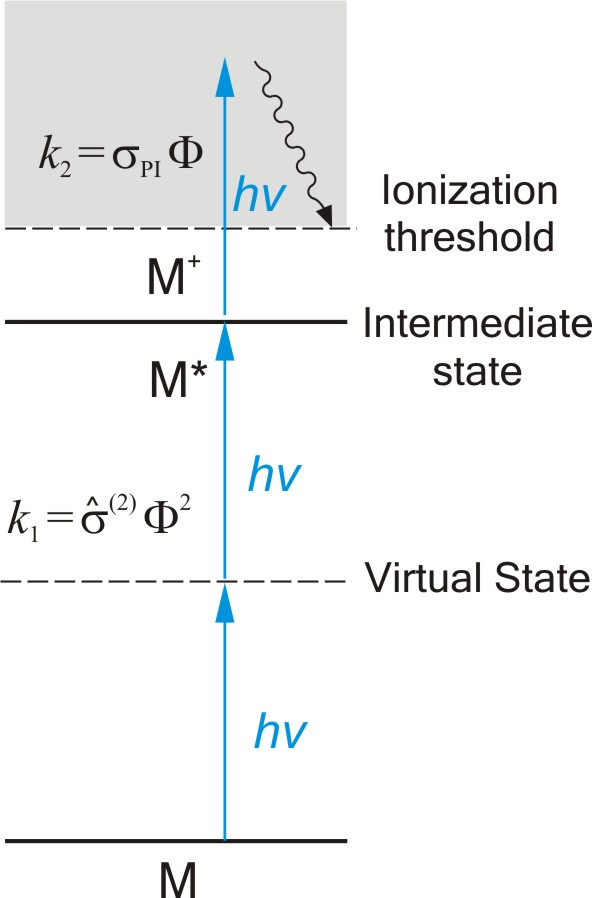
(2+1) REMPI

Resonance-enhanced multiphoton ionization (REMPI) is a technique applied to the spectroscopy of atoms and small molecules. In practice, a tunable laser can be used to access an excited intermediate state. The selection rules associated with a two-photon or other multiphoton photoabsorption are different from the selection rules for a single photon transition. The REMPI technique typically involves a resonant single or multiple photon absorption to an electronically excited intermediate state followed by another photon which ionizes the atom or molecule. The light intensity to achieve a typical multiphoton transition is generally significantly larger than the light intensity to achieve a single photon photoabsorption. Because of this, subsequent photoabsorption is often very likely. An ion and a free electron will result if the photons have imparted enough energy to exceed the ionization threshold energy of the system. In many cases, REMPI provides spectroscopic information that can be unavailable to single photon spectroscopic methods, for example rotational structure in molecules is easily seen with this technique.

REMPI is usually generated by a focused frequency tunable laser beam to form a small-volume plasma. In REMPI, first m photons are simultaneously absorbed by an atom or molecule in the sample to bring it to an excited state. Other n photons are absorbed afterwards to generate an electron and ion pair. The so-called m+n REMPI is a nonlinear optical process, which can only occur within the focus of the laser beam. A small-volume plasma is formed near the laser focal region. If the energy of m photons does not match any state, an off-resonant transition can occur with an energy defect ΔE, however, the electron is very unlikely to remain in that state. For large detuning, it resides there only during the time Δt. The uncertainty principle is satisfied for Δt, where ћ=h/2π and h is the Planck constant (6.6261×10^-34 J∙s). Such transition and states are called virtual, unlike real transitions to states with long lifetimes. The real transition probability is many orders of magnitude higher than the virtual transition one, which is called resonance enhanced effect.

== Rydberg states ==
High photon intensity experiments can involve multiphoton processes with the absorption of integer multiples of the photon energy. In experiments that involve a multiphoton resonance, the intermediate is often a low-lying Rydberg state, and the final state is often an ion. The initial state of the system, photon energy, angular momentum and other selection rules can help in determining the nature of the intermediate state. This approach is exploited in resonance-enhanced multiphoton ionization spectroscopy (REMPI). The technique is in wide use in both atomic and molecular spectroscopy. An advantage of the REMPI technique is that the ions can be detected with almost complete efficiency and even time resolved for their mass. It is also possible to gain additional information by performing experiments to look at the energy of the liberated photoelectron in these experiments.

== Microwave detection ==
Coherent microwave scattering from electrons in REMPI-induced plasma filaments adds the capability to measure selectively-ionized species with a high spatial and temporal resolution - allowing for nonintrusive determinations of concentration profiles without the use of physical probes or electrodes. It has been applied for the detection of species such as argon, xenon, nitric oxide, carbon monoxide, atomic oxygen, and methyl radicals both within enclosed cells, open air, and atmospheric flames.

Microwave detection is based on homodyne or heterodyne technologies. They can significantly increase the detection sensitivity by suppressing the noise and follow sub-nanosecond plasma generation and evolution. The homodyne detection method mixes the detected microwave electric field with its own source to produce a signal proportional to the product of the two. The signal frequency is converted down from tens of gigahertz to below one gigahertz so that the signal can be amplified and observed with standard electronic devices. Because of the high sensitivity associated with the homodyne detection method, the lack of background noise in the microwave regime, and the capability of time gating of the detection electronics synchronous with the laser pulse, very high SNRs are possible even with milliwatt microwave sources. These high SNRs allow the temporal behavior of the microwave signal to be followed on a sub-nanosecond time scale. Thus the lifetime of electrons within the plasma can be recorded. By utilizing a microwave circulator, a single microwave horn transceiver has been built, which significantly simplifies the experimental setup.

Detection in the microwave region has numerous advantages over optical detection. Using homodyne or heterodyne technologies, the electric field rather than the power can be detected, so much better noise rejection can be achieved. In contrast to optical heterodyne techniques, no alignment or mode matching of the reference is necessary. The long wavelength of the microwaves leads to effective point coherent scattering from the plasma in the laser focal volume, so phase matching is unimportant and scattering in the backward direction is strong. Many microwave photons can be scattered from a single electron, so the amplitude of the scattering can be increased by increasing the power of the microwave transmitter. The low energy of the microwave photons corresponds to thousands of more photons per unit energy than in the visible region, so shot noise is drastically reduced. For weak ionization characteristic of trace species diagnostics, the measured electric field is a linear function of the number of electrons which is directly proportional to the trace species concentration. Furthermore, there is very little solar or other natural background radiation in the microwave spectral region.

== See also ==
- Rydberg ionization spectroscopy
- Compare with laser-induced fluorescence (LIF)
