= Coherent microwave scattering =

Technique for characterizing small plasma objects

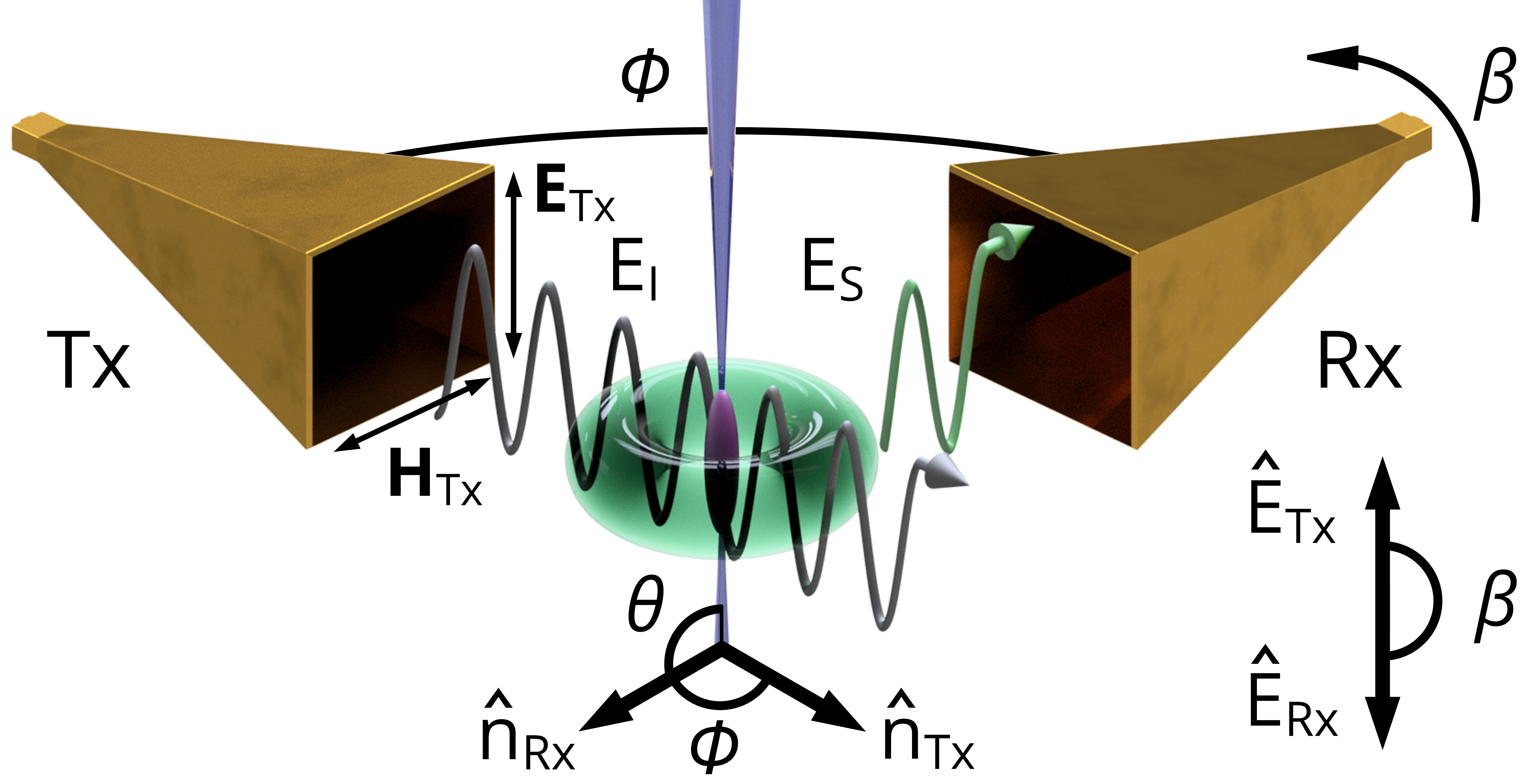
A visualization of coherent microwave scattering. In this embodiment, a transmitting horn (Tx) irradiates an unmagnetized small plasma object with linearly-polarized microwaves, and the scattered radiation is collected via a receiving horn (Rx).

Coherent microwave scattering is a diagnostic technique used in the characterization of classical microplasmas. In this technique, the plasma to be studied is irradiated with a long-wavelength microwave field relative to the characteristic spatial dimensions of the plasma. For plasmas with sufficiently low skin-depths, the target is periodically polarized in a uniform fashion, and the scattered field can be measured and analyzed. In this case, the emitted radiation resembles that of a short-dipole predominantly determined by electron contributions rather than ions. The scattering is correspondingly referred to as constructive elastic. Various properties can be derived from the measured radiation such as total electron numbers, electron number densities (if the plasma volume is known), local magnetic fields through magnetically-induced depolarization, and electron collision frequencies for momentum transfer through the scattered phase. Notable advantages of the technique include a high sensitivity, ease of calibration using a dielectric scattering sample, good temporal resolution, low shot noise, non-intrusive probing, species-selectivity when coupled with resonance-enhanced multiphoton ionization (REMPI), single-shot acquisition, and the capability of time-gating due to continuous scanning.

== History ==
Initially devised by Mikhail Shneider and Richard Miles at Princeton University, coherent microwave scattering has become a valuable technique in applications ranging from photoionization and electron-loss rate measurements to trace species detection, gaseous mixture and reaction characterization, molecular spectroscopy, electron propulsion device characterization, standoff measurement of electron collision frequencies for momentum transfer through the scattered phase, and standoff measurement of local vector magnetic fields through magnetically-induced depolarization.

== Scattering regimes ==
For the simplest embodiment of linearly-polarized microwave scattering in the absence of magnetic depolarization, three regimes may arise due to the correlation between scatterers. The Thomson regime refers to free plasma electrons oscillating in-phase with the incident microwave field. The total scattering cross-section of an independent electron then coincides with the classical Thomson cross section and is independent of the microwave wavelength λ. Second, Shneider-Miles scattering (SM, often referred to as collisional scattering) refers to collision-dominated electron motion with displacement oscillations shifted 90 degrees with respect to the irradiating field. The total scattering cross-section correspondingly exhibits a ω^{2} dependency - a unique regime made possible through interparticle interactions. Finally, the Rayleigh scattering regime can be observed which is associated with restoring-force-dominated electron motion and shares a ω^{4} dependence with its volumetric polarizability optical counterpart. In this case the "scattering particle" refers to the entire plasma object. As such, plasma expansion may cause a transition towards Mie scattering. Note that the Rayleigh regime refers to small particle ω^{4} scattering here, rather than an even broader small-dipole approximation of the radiation.
