= Eurisol =

European Isotope Separation On-Line

The EURISOL project was conceived as a next-generation European ISOL radioactive ion beam (RIB) facility, designed to push the frontiers of atomic and nuclear physics by delivering unprecedented intensities of exotic ion beams and enabling research beyond the capabilities of existing infrastructures.

RIB facilities make possible studies of exotic nuclei (neutron/proton-rich) far from stability; nuclear astrophysics with reactions for stellar nucleosynthesis and cosmology; applications in material science; fundamental tests for physics beyond the standard model.

When the idea was first proposed, studies had also started towards constructing the Facility for Antiproton and Ion Research (FAIR) in Germany, and proposals were made in the USA for the Rare Isotope Accelerator (RIA). Since FAIR was based on in-flight isotope separation, a technology distinct from the ISOL (Isotope Separation On-Line) method, it was soon realized that the two projects were complementary and would have provided a high-power facility for European scientists.

The first step of EURISOL was a Feasibility Study co-financed by the European Commission under its Fifth Framework Programme (FP5) from 2000 to 2003. In the same years, several other ISOL projects were proposed, such as SPIRAL2 at GANIL (France), HIE-ISOLDE at CERN, and SPES at LNL, Legnaro (Italy), "smaller" scale facilities, now in operation. Similar efforts included ISAC-II at TRIUMF, Canada and RIKEN RI Beam Factory (RIBF) al RIKEN Nishina Center (Wako, Saitama). The Design Study (2005-2009) was co-funded by the European Commission under the 6th Framework Programme: “Structuring the European Research Area”. In parallel (December 2008), DoE accepted the FRIB (Facility for Rare Isotope Beams) proposal, located at Michigan State University, reducing the scope of the RIA.

In 2010, EURISOL had been endorsed by the Nuclear Physics European Collaboration Committee (NuPECC) as the highest long term priority for low-energy nuclear physics in Europe, but failed to be included in the European Roadmap for Research Infrastructures (ESFRI). Recognizing that a single-site EURISOL would not be achievable in the near term, the community launched the EURISOL Distributed Facility (EURISOL-DF) initiative around 2016–2017, linking existing and upcoming European ISOL facilities into a coordinated network and considering EURISOL as a single site facility as a long-term goal. However, EURISOL-DF was never established as a legal entity. The EU funded coordination network for nuclear physics had been "European Nuclear Science and Applications Research" (ENSAR) (2010-2014), followed by ENSAR 2 (2016-2020) and EURO-LABS (2022-2026).

Although EURISOL was never realized as a single facility, its legacy remains significant. The project unified the European nuclear physics community around a shared vision for next-generation ISOL technologies, setting technical, scientific, and collaborative standards that still guide current facilities. Many of its design concepts and infrastructure plans influenced european initiatives, such as SPIRAL2, HIE-ISOLDE, and SPES.

== Eurisol Design Study ==
The Design Study (DS) was supported by a Consortium of twenty partner institutions, while another twenty-one international institutions joined the project as "collaborators," without EC funding. It was coordinated by a Management Board consisting of Yorick Blumenfeld (IPN Orsay/CERN, Project Leader in 2007-2009), Peter Butler (Liverpool University), Graziano Fortuna (INFN, Project Leader in 2005-2006), and Mats Lindroos (CERN).

The baseline layout consisted of a superconducting linear accelerator designed to provide protons with an energy of 1 GeV and a power of 5 MW, and was also capable of accelerating deuterons, ³He, and ions up to mass 40. The beams were intended to impinge simultaneously on two types of targets, either directly or after conversion of the protons into neutrons through a spallation target surrounded by kilograms of fissile material. The unstable nuclei produced would diffuse out of the target, be ionized and selected, and could be used directly at low energy or reaccelerated by another linear accelerator to energies up to 150 MeV per nucleon in order to induce nuclear reactions.

The design study was divided into 12 tasks covering management, Multi-MW Target Station, Direct Target, Fission Target, Safety & Radioprotection, Heavy-Ion Accelerator, Proton Accelerator, Superconducting Cavity, Beam Preparation, Physics & Instrumentation, Beam Intensity Calculations. An integral part of the programme was a neutrino beta‑beam facility making use of the beta decays of the large quantities of radioactive nuclei produced and accelerated to energies of several hundred GeV.
