= Resonance ionization =

Process to excite an atom beyond its ionization potential to form an ion

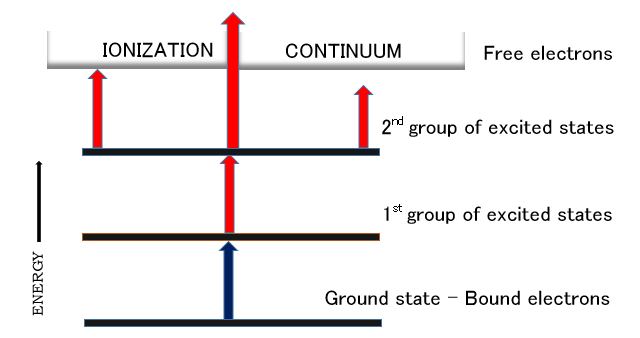
Photon beams from a tunable laser are used to selectively excite and promote cloud of atoms or molecules from ground state to higher excited states in resonance ionization.

Resonance ionization is a process in optical physics used to excite a specific atom (or molecule) beyond its ionization potential to form an ion using a beam of photons irradiated from a pulsed laser light. In resonance ionization, the absorption or emission properties of the emitted photons are not considered, rather only the resulting excited ions are mass-selected, detected and measured. Depending on the laser light source used, one electron can be removed from each atom so that resonance ionization produces an efficient selectivity in two ways: elemental selectivity in ionization and isotopic selectivity in measurement.

During resonance ionization, an ion gun or desorption laser creates a cloud of atoms and molecules from a solid surface or gas-phase sample before a tunable laser is used to fire a beam of photons at the cloud of particles emanating from the sample (analyte).

An initial photon from this beam is absorbed by one of the sample atoms, exciting one of the atom's electrons to an intermediate excited state. A second photon then ionizes the same atom from the intermediate state such that its high energy level causes it to be ejected from its orbital; the result is a packet of positively charged ions which are then delivered to a mass analyzer.

Resonance ionization contrasts with resonance-enhanced multiphoton ionization (REMPI) in that the latter is neither selective nor efficient since resonances are seldom used to prevent interference. Also, resonance ionization is used for an atomic (elemental) analyte, whereas REMPI is used for a molecular analyte.

The analytical technique on which the process of resonance ionization is based is termed resonance ionization mass spectrometry (RIMS). RIMS is derived from the original method, resonance ionization spectroscopy (RIS), which was initially being used to detect single atoms with better time resolution. RIMS has proved useful in the investigation of radioactive isotopes (such as for studying rare fleeting isotopes produced in high-energy collisions), trace analysis (such as for discovering impurities in highly pure materials), atomic spectroscopy (such as for detecting low-content materials in biological samples), and for applications in which high levels of sensitivity and elemental selectivity are desired.

== History ==
Resonance ionization was first used in a spectroscopy experiment in 1971 at the Institute for Spectroscopy Russian Academy of Sciences; in that experiment, ground state rubidium atoms were ionized using ruby lasers. In 1974, a group of photophysical researchers at the Oak Ridge National Laboratory led by George Samuel Hurst developed, for the first time, the resonance ionization process on helium atoms. They wanted to use laser light to measure the number of singlet metastable helium, He (2^{1}S), particles created from energetic protons. The group achieved the selective ionization of the excited state of an atom at nearly 100% efficiency by using pulsed laser light to pass a beam of protons into the helium gas cell. The experiment on singlet metastable helium atoms was seminal in the journey towards using resonance ionization spectroscopy (RIS) for extensive atomic analysis in research settings.

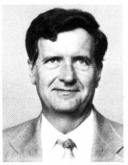
George Samuel Hurst led the photophysics group at Oak Ridge National Laboratory that measured, for the first time, the population of metastable helium particles using resonance ionization.

Cesium atoms was subsequently used to show that single atoms of an element could be counted if its resonance ionization was performed in a counter in which an electron could be detected for an atom in its ground state. Subsequently, advanced techniques categorized under resonance ionization mass spectrometry (RIMS) were used to generate the relative abundance of various ion types by coupling the RIS lasers to magnetic sector, quadrupole, or time-of-flight (TOF) mass spectrometers.

The field of resonance ionization spectroscopy (RIS) has largely been shaped by the formal and informal communications heralding its discovery. Research papers on RIS have heavily relied on self-citation from inception, a trend which climaxed three years later with the founding of a company to commercialize the technique.

== Method ==
A model resonance ionization mass spectrometry (RIMS) set-up consists of a laser system (consisting of multiple lasers), sample from which the atoms are derived, and a suitable mass spectrometer which mass-selectively detects the photo ions created from resonance. In resonant ionization, atoms or molecules from ground state are excited to higher energy states by the resonant absorption of photons to produce ions. These ions are then monitored by appropriate detectors. In order to ensure a highly-efficient sensitivity and process saturation, the atomic or molecular beam must be formed from the ground state, the atoms should be efficiently excited and ionized, and each atom should be converted by the photon field of a short-timed pulsed laser to produce a positive ion and a valence electron.

In a basic RIS process, a pulsed laser beam produces photons of the right energy in order to excite an atom initially in its ground state, a, to an excited level, b. During the laser pulse, the ion population of state b increases at the expense of that of state a. After a few minutes, the rate of stimulated emission from the excited state will equal rate of production so that the system is in equilibrium as long as the laser intensity is kept sufficiently high during a pulse. This high laser intensity translates into a photon fluence (photons per unit of beam area) large enough so that a necessary condition for the saturation of the RIS process has been met. If, in addition, the rate of photoionization is greater than the rate of consumption of intermediates, then each selected state is converted to one electron plus one positive ion, so that the RIS process is saturated.

A usually efficient way to produce free atoms of an element in the ground state is to atomize the elements by ion sputtering or thermal vaporization of the element from a laser matrix under vacuum conditions or at environments with pressures significantly less than normal atmospheric pressure. The resulting plume of secondary atoms is then channeled through the path of multiple tuned laser beams which are capable of exciting consecutive electronic transitions in the specified element. Light from these tuned lasers promotes the desired atoms above their ionization potentials whereas interfering atoms from other elements are hardly ionized since they are generally transparent to the laser beam. This process produces photoions which are extracted and directed towards an analytical facility such as a magnetic sector to be counted. This approach is extremely sensitive to atoms of the specified element so that the ionization efficiency is almost 100% and also elementally selective, due to the highly unlikely chance that other species will be resonantly ionized.

To achieve high ionization efficiencies, monochromatic lasers with high instantaneous spectral power are used. Typical lasers being used include continuous-wave lasers with extremely high spectral purity and pulsed lasers for analyses involving limited atoms. Continuous-wave lasers however are often preferred to pulsed lasers due to the latter's relatively low duty cycle since they can only produce photo ions during the brief later pulses, and the difficulty in reproducing results due to pulse-to-pulse jitters, laser beam drifting, and wavelength variations.

Moderate laser powers, if high enough to affect the desired transition states, can be used since the non-resonant photoionization cross section is low which implies a negligible ionization efficiency of unwanted atoms. The influence of the laser matrix to be used for the sample can also be reduced by separating evaporation and ionization processes both in time and in space.

Another factor that could affect the efficiency and selectivity of the ionization process is the presence of contaminants caused by surface or impact ionization. This can be reduced up to appreciable orders of magnitude by using mass analysis so that isotopic compositions of the desired element are determined. Most of the elements of the Periodic Table can be ionized by one of the several excitation schemes available.

The suitable excitation scheme depends on certain factors including the level scheme of the element's atom, its ionization energy, required selectivity and sensitivity, likely interference, and the wavelengths and power levels of the available laser systems. Most excitation schemes vary in the last step, the ionization step. This is due to the low cross-section for non-resonant photo-ionization produced by the laser. A pulsed laser system facilitates the efficient coupling of a time-of-flight mass spectrometer (TOF-MS) to the resonance ionization set-up due to the instrument's abundance sensitivity. This is because TOF systems can produce an abundance sensitivity of up to 10^{4} whereas magnetic mass spectrometers can only achieve up to 10^{2}.

The total selectivity in a RIS process is a combination of the sensitivities in the various resonance transitions for multiple step-wise excitations. The probability of an atom to come in contact with the resonance of another atom is about 10^{−5}. The addition of a mass spectrometer increases this figure by a factor of 10^{6} such that the total elemental selectivity surpasses or at least compares to that of tandem mass spectrometry (MS/MS), the most selective technique available.

== Optical excitation and ionization schemes ==
Optical ionization schemes are developed to produce element-selective ion source for various elements. Most of the elements of the periodic table have been resonantly ionized by using one of five major optical routes based on the principle of RIMS.

The routes were formed by the absorption of two or three photons to achieve excitation and ionization and are provided on the basis of optically possible transitions between atomic levels in a process called the bound-bound transition. For an atom of the element to be promoted to a bound-continuum, the energies emitted from the photons must be within the energy range of the selected tunable lasers. Also, the ionization energy of the last emitted photon must exceed that of the atom.

The optical ionization schemes are denoted by the amount of photons necessary to make the ion pair. For the first two Schemes 1 and 2, two photons (and processes) are involved. One photon excites the atom from the ground state to an intermediate state while the second photon ionizes the atom. In Schemes 3 and 4, three photons (and processes) are involved. The first two distinct photons create consecutive bound-bound transitions within the selected atom while the third photon is absorbed for ionization. Scheme 5 is a three-photon two-intermediate-level photoionization process. After the first two photons have been absorbed by the optical energy, the third photon achieves ionization.

The RIS process can be used to ionize all elements on the periodic table, except helium and neon, using available lasers. In fact, it is possible to ionize most elements with a single laser set-up, thus enabling rapid switching from one element to another. In the early days, optical schemes from RIMS have been used to study over 70 elements and over 39 elements can be ionized with a single laser combination using a rapid computer-modulated framework that switches elements within seconds.

== Applications ==
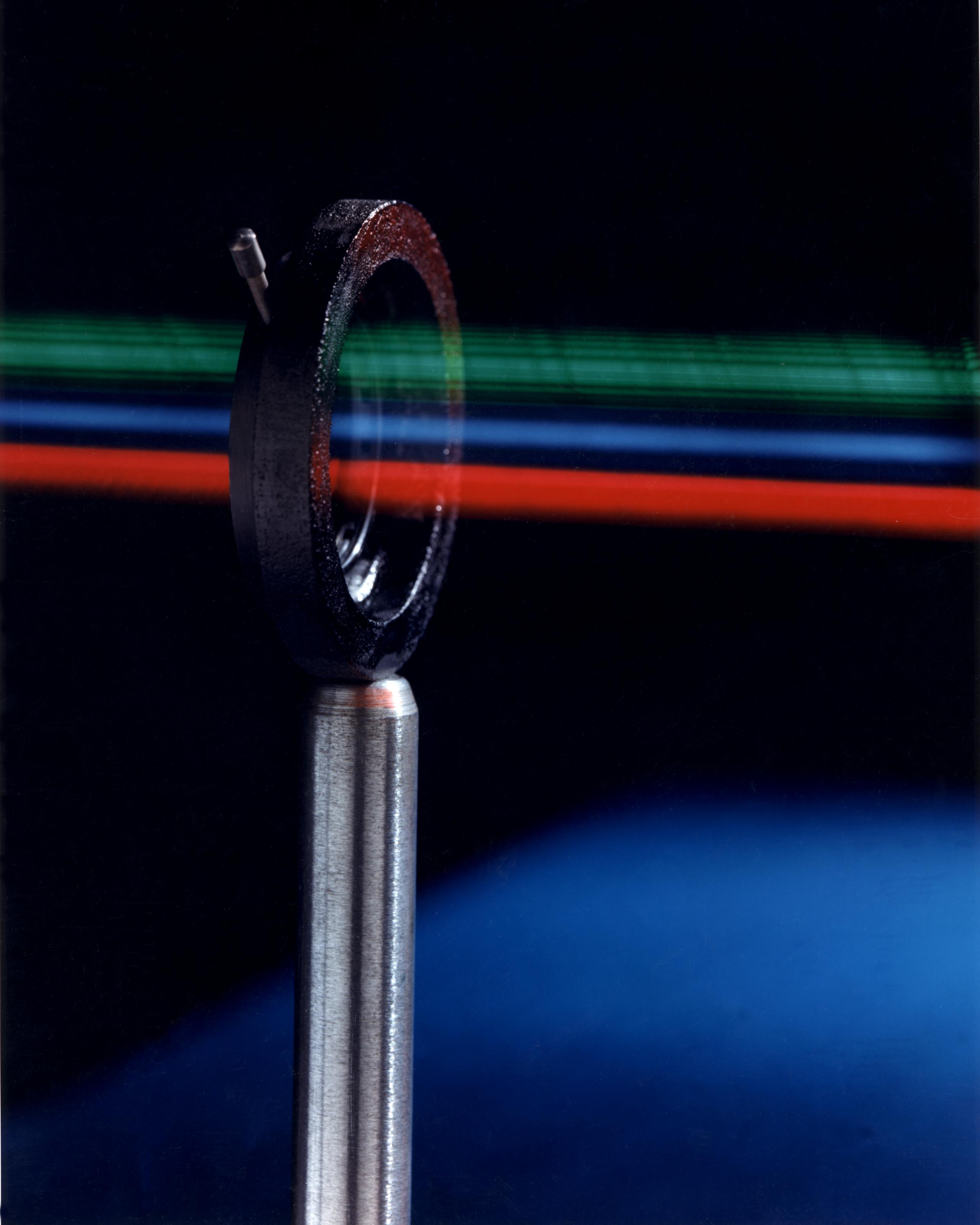
Surface analysis resonance ionization uses a multi-step excitation technique to avoid the interference of background atoms in detecting trace amounts of impurities on material surfaces. This ultra-sensitive technique is especially important in the manufacture of super-miniature semiconductors.

As an analytical technique, RIS is useful based on some of its working operations – they include extremely low detection limit so that mass of samples could be identified up to the order of 10^{−15}, the extremely high sensitivity and elemental selectivity useful in micro- and trace analysis when coupled with mass spectrometers, and ability of the pulsed laser ion source to produce pure isobaric ion beams.

A major advantage of using resonance ionization is that it is a highly selective ionization mode; it is able to target a single type of atom among a background of many types of atoms, even when said background atoms are much more abundant than the target atoms. In addition, resonance ionization incorporates the high selectivity that is desired in spectroscopy methods with ultrasensitivity, thus making resonance ionization useful when analyzing complex samples with several atomic components.

Resonance ionization spectroscopy (RIS) thus has a wide range of research and industrial applications. These include characterizing the diffusion and chemical reaction of free atoms in a gas medium, solid state surface analysis using direct sampling, studying the degree of concentration variations in a dilute vapor, detecting the allowable limits of number of particles needed in a semiconductor device, and estimating the flux of solar neutrinos on Earth.

Other uses include determining high-precision values for plutonium and uranium isotopes in a rapid fashion, investigating the atomic properties of technetium at the ultra trace level, and capturing the concurrent excitation of stable daughter atoms with the decay of their parent atoms as is the case for alpha particles, beta rays, and positrons.

RIS is now in very common use in research facilities where the quick and quantitative determination of the elemental composition of materials is important.

Pulsed laser light sources provide higher photon fluxes than continuous-wave lasers do, however the use of pulsed lasers currently limit vast applications of RIMS in two ways. One, photo ions are created only during short laser pulses, thus significantly reducing the duty cycle of pulsed resonance ionization mass spectrometers relative to their continuous-beam counterparts. Two, incessant drifts in laser pointing and pulse timing alongside jitters between pulses severely hamper chances of reproducibility.

These issues affect the extent to which resonance ionization can be used to solve some of the challenges confronted by practical analysts today; even so, applications of RIMS are replete in various traditional and emerging disciplines such as cosmochemistry, medical research, environmental chemistry, geophysical sciences, nuclear physics, genome sequencing, and semiconductors.

== See also ==
- Resonance-enhanced multiphoton ionization
- Rydberg ionization spectroscopy
- Photoionization
- Atmospheric-pressure laser ionization
- Radiometric dating
- Electron excitation
- Tunable lasers
- Cosmochemistry

== Patents ==
- US patent 3987302, George S. Hurst, Marvin G. Payne, Edward B. Wagner, "Resonance ionization for analytical spectroscopy", issued October 19, 1976
- US patent 4,442,354, Hurst, G. Samuel, James E. Parks, James E. & Schmitt, Harold W, "Method of analyzing for a component in a sample", issued April 10, 1984
