= Rydberg ionization spectroscopy =

Rydberg ionization spectroscopy is a spectroscopy technique in which multiple photons are absorbed by an atom causing the removal of an electron to form an ion.

== Resonance ionization spectroscopy ==
The ionization threshold energy of atoms and small molecules are typically larger than the photon energies that are most easily available experimentally. However, it can be possible to span this ionization threshold energy if the photon energy is resonant with an intermediate electronically excited state. While it is often possible to observe the lower Rydberg levels in conventional spectroscopy of atoms and small molecules, Rydberg states are even more important in laser ionization experiments. Laser spectroscopic experiments often involve ionization through a photon energy resonance at an intermediate level, with an unbound final electron state and an ionic core. On resonance for phototransitions permitted by selection rules, the intensity of the laser in combination with the excited state lifetime makes ionization an expected outcome. This RIS approach and variations permit sensitive detection of specific species.

== Low Rydberg levels and resonance enhanced multiphoton ionization ==
High photon intensity experiments can involve multiphoton processes with the absorption of integer multiples of the photon energy. In experiments that involve a multiphoton resonance, the intermediate is often a Rydberg state, and the final state is often an ion. The initial state of the system, photon energy, angular momentum and other selection rules can help in determining the nature of the intermediate state. This approach is exploited in resonance enhanced multiphoton ionization spectroscopy (REMPI). An advantage of this spectroscopic technique is that the ions can be detected with almost complete efficiency and even resolved for their mass. It is also possible to gain additional information by performing experiments to look at the energy of the liberated photoelectron in these experiments. (Compton and Johnson pioneered the development of REMPI)

== Near-threshold Rydberg levels ==
The same approach that produces an ionization event can be used to access the dense manifold of near-threshold Rydberg states with laser experiments. These experiments often involve a laser operating at one wavelength to access the intermediate Rydberg state and a second wavelength laser to access the near-threshold Rydberg state region. Because of the photoabsorption selection rules, these Rydberg electrons are expected to be in highly elliptical angular momentum states. It is the Rydberg electrons excited to nearly circular angular momentum states that are expected to have the longest lifetimes. The conversion between a highly elliptical and a nearly circular near-threshold Rydberg state might happen in several ways, including encountering small stray electric fields.

== Zero electron kinetic energy spectroscopy ==
Zero electron kinetic energy (ZEKE) spectroscopy was developed with the idea of collecting only the resonance ionization photoelectrons that have extremely low kinetic energy. The technique involves waiting for a period of time after a resonance ionization experiment and then pulsing an electric field to collect the lowest energy photoelectrons in a detector. Typically, ZEKE experiments utilize two different tunable lasers. One laser photon energy is tuned to be resonant with the energy of an intermediate state. (This may be resonant with an excited state at a multiphoton transition.) Another photon energy is tuned to be close to the ionization threshold energy. The technique worked extremely well and demonstrated energy resolution that was significantly better than the laser bandwidth. It turns out that it was not the photoelectrons that were detected in ZEKE. The delay between the laser and the electric field pulse selected the longest lived and most circular Rydberg states closest to the energy of the ion core. The population distribution of surviving long-lived near threshold Rydberg states is close to the laser energy bandwidth. The electric field pulse Stark shifts the near-threshold Rydberg states and vibrational autoionization occurs. ZEKE has provided a significant advance in the study of the vibrational spectroscopy of molecular ions. Schlag, Peatman and Müller-Dethlefs originated ZEKE spectroscopy.

== Mass analyzed threshold ionization ==
Mass analyzed threshold ionization (MATI) was developed with idea of collecting the mass of the ions in a ZEKE experiment.

MATI offered a mass resolution advantage to ZEKE. Because MATI also exploits vibrational autoionization of near-threshold Rydberg states, it also can offer a comparable resolution with the laser bandwidth. This information can be indispensable in understanding a variety of systems.

== Photo-induced Rydberg ionization ==
Photo-induced Rydberg ionization (PIRI) was developed following REMPI experiments on electronic autoionization of low-lying Rydberg states of carbon dioxide. In REMPI photoelectron experiments, it was determined that a two-photon ionic core photoabsorption process (followed by prompt electronic autoionization) could dominate the direct single photon absorption in the ionization of some Rydberg states of carbon dioxide. These sorts of two excited electron systems had already been under study in the atomic physics, but there the experiments involved high order Rydberg states. PIRI works because electronic autoionization can dominate direct photoionization (photoionization). The circularized near-threshold Rydberg state is more likely to undergo a core photoabsorption than to absorb a photon and directly ionize the Rydberg state. PIRI extends the near-threshold spectroscopic techniques to allow access to the electronic states (including dissociative molecular states and other hard to study systems) as well as the vibrational states of molecular ions.
