= Electrostatic fieldmeter =

Tool for measuring electrostatic charge on objects

A digital electrostatic fieldmeter for measuring electrostatic charges

An electrostatic fieldmeter, also called a static meter or electrostatic voltmeter is a tool used primarily in the static control industry for non-contact measurement of electrostatic fields and surface potentials. It detects the electric field strength (typically in volts per meter V/m or volts per inch V/in) generated by charged objects, which can indicate the magnitude and polarity of electrostatic charges.

Operation

Typically, electrostatic fieldmeters should be grounded to an ESD grounding/bonding reference point using a connecting point provided on the fieldmeter. Alternatively, some fieldmeters utilize conductive cases and can be grounded through the person holding the fieldmeter if the person utilizes a grounding wriststrap of other grounding method.

Position the fieldmeter at the distance stipulated by the manufacturer. Many electrostatic fieldmeters are calibrated to measure from a distance of 1-inch or 25mm. Allow the measurement to stabilize for a few seconds. Fieldmeters typically utilize sensors that require measurement settling time when the field strength changes, which can be caused by moving the fieldmeter closer to or away from the measured surface or object.

Electrode

The operation of an electrostatic field meter can be based on the charge-discharge process of an electrically floating electrode: Corona source charges a floating electrode, which discharges with a regular repetition frequency to the earth-electrode. The discharge repetition frequency is the measured variable which is a function of the background electrostatic field. Beside static charge control in electrostatic discharge (ESD) sensitive environments, another possible application is the measurement of the atmospheric electric field, if sufficient sensitivity is available.

== See also ==
- Coulombmeter
- Electrometer
- Electroscope
- Electrostatic voltmeter
- Faraday cup
