= Electroscope =

Early scientific instrument to detect charge

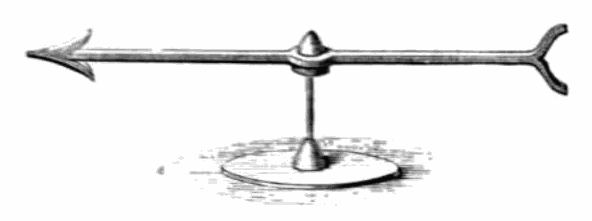
Gilbert's versorium

The electroscope is an early scientific instrument used to detect the presence of electric charge on a body. It detects this by the movement of a test charge due to the Coulomb electrostatic force on it. The amount of charge on an object is proportional to its voltage. The accumulation of enough charge to detect with an electroscope requires hundreds or thousands of volts, so electroscopes are used with high voltage sources such as static electricity and electrostatic machines. An electroscope can only give a rough indication of the quantity of charge; an instrument that measures electric charge quantitatively is called an electrometer.

The electroscope was the first electrical measuring instrument. The first electroscope was a pivoted needle (called the versorium), invented by British physician William Gilbert around 1600. The pith-ball electroscope and the gold-leaf electroscope are two classical types of electroscope that are still used in physics education to demonstrate the principles of electrostatics. A type of electroscope is also used in the quartz fiber radiation dosimeter. Electroscopes were used by the Austrian scientist Victor Hess in the discovery of cosmic rays.

== Pith-ball electroscope ==
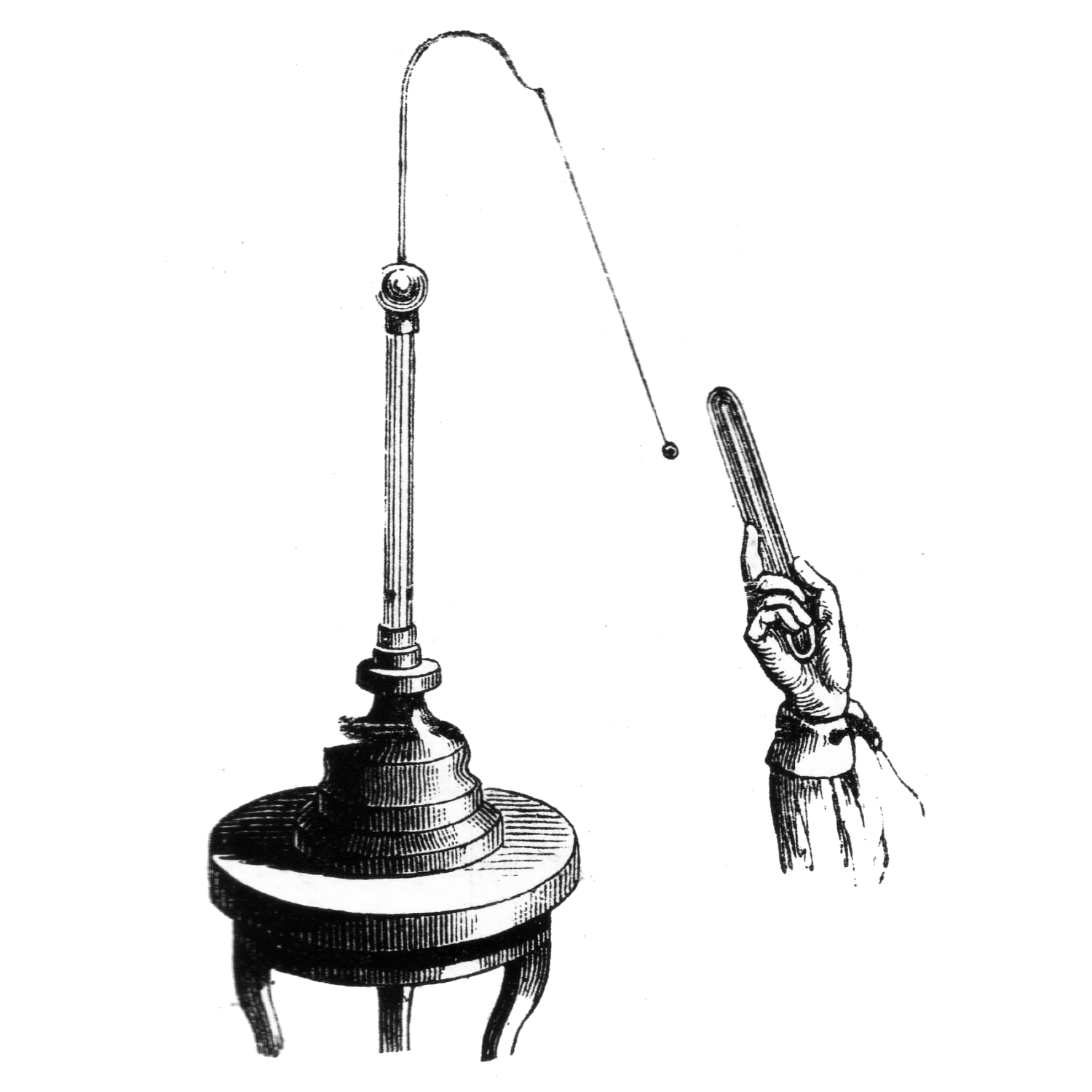
Pith ball electroscope from the 1870s, showing attraction to charged object

How it works

In 1731, Stephen Gray used a simple hanging thread, which would be attracted to any nearby charged object. This was the first improvement on Gilbert's versorium from 1600.

The pith-ball electroscope, invented by British schoolmaster and physicist John Canton in 1754, consists of one or two small balls of a lightweight nonconductive substance, originally a spongy plant material called pith, suspended by silk or linen thread from the hook of an insulated stand. Tiberius Cavallo made an electroscope in 1770 with pith balls at the end of silver wires. Modern electroscopes usually use balls made of plastic. In order to test the presence of a charge on an object, the object is brought near to the uncharged pith ball. If the object is charged, the ball will be attracted to it and move toward it.

The attraction occurs because of induced polarization of the atoms inside the pith ball. All matter consists of electrically charged particles located close together; each atom consists of a positively charged nucleus with a cloud of negatively charged electrons surrounding it. The pith is an insulator, so the electrons in the ball are bound to atoms of the pith and are not free to leave the atoms and move about in the ball, but they can move a little within the atoms. See diagram. If, for example, a positively charged object (B) is brought near the pith ball (A), the negative electrons (blue minus signs) in each atom (yellow ovals) will be attracted and move slightly toward the side of the atom nearer the object. The positively charged nuclei (red plus signs) will be repelled and will move slightly away. Since the negative charges in the pith ball are now nearer to the object than the positive charges (C), their attraction is greater than the repulsion of the positive charges, resulting in a net attractive force. This separation of charge is microscopic, but since there are so many atoms, the tiny forces add up to a large enough force to move a light pith ball.

If the external object (B) instead has a negative charge, the positive nuclei of each atom will be attracted toward it while the electrons will be repelled away from it. Again, this causes opposite charges to be closer to the external object than charges of the same polarity, resulting in a net attractive force.

The pith ball can be charged by touching it to a charged object, so some of the charges on the surface of the charged object move to the surface of the ball. Then the ball can be used to distinguish the polarity of charge on other objects because it will be repelled by objects charged with the same polarity or sign it has, but attracted to charges of the opposite polarity.

Often the electroscope will have a pair of suspended pith balls. This allows one to tell at a glance whether the pith balls are charged. If one of the pith balls is touched to a charged object, charging it, the second one will be attracted and touch it, communicating some of the charge to the surface of the second ball. Now both balls have the same polarity charge, so they repel each other. They hang in an inverted 'V' shape with the balls spread apart. The distance between the balls will give a rough idea of the magnitude of the charge.

== Gold-leaf electroscope ==
Gold-leaf electroscope showing electrostatic induction

The gold-leaf electroscope was developed in 1787 by British clergyman and physicist Abraham Bennet, as a more sensitive instrument than the pith-ball and straw-blade electroscopes then in use. It consists of a vertical metal rod, usually brass, from which hang two parallel strips of thin, flexible gold leaf. A disk or ball terminal is attached to the top of the rod, where an electric charge can be applied or detected.

The gold leaves are enclosed in a glass case to protect them from air currents. The case may contain grounded metal plates or foil strips beside the leaves. These provide a path for discharge if the leaves receive an excessive charge and can also reduce the accumulation of charge on the inside of the glass. In some precision instruments, the interior of the case was evacuated to reduce leakage of charge through ionized air.

When the metal terminal is touched with a charged object, charge is transferred through the terminal and metal rod to the leaves. The two leaves then acquire charges of the same sign and move apart. When the terminal is connected to electrical ground, charge flows between the electroscope and ground, and the leaves return toward their initial position.

The electroscope can also be charged by electrostatic induction without touching the terminal. When a charged object is brought near the terminal, charge is redistributed within the conducting rod and leaves. If the electroscope is briefly connected to ground while the charged object remains nearby, charge flows between the electroscope and ground. After the ground connection is removed and the charged object is taken away, the electroscope retains a net charge of opposite sign to the inducing object, and the leaves diverge.

The Bohnenberger electroscope was developed in the early 19th century by the German physicist Johann Gottlieb Friedrich von Bohnenberger as an improvement on earlier gold-leaf electroscopes. It employed a single gold leaf suspended between two oppositely charged plates, increasing sensitivity and allowing the presence and sign of an electric charge to be detected.

Bohnenberger electroscopes were used in 19th-century experimental physics and are represented in historical university laboratories, teaching collections, and scientific-instrument collections.The design influenced later high-sensitivity electroscopic instruments.

Eberbach & Son electroscope instruments were designed primarily for educational and laboratory use, following classical electroscope principles while emphasizing robustness and standardized construction for teaching environments.

While they did not introduce new electroscopic principles, they played a role in the standardization of electrostatics instruction in North America.

Gold-leaf electroscopes

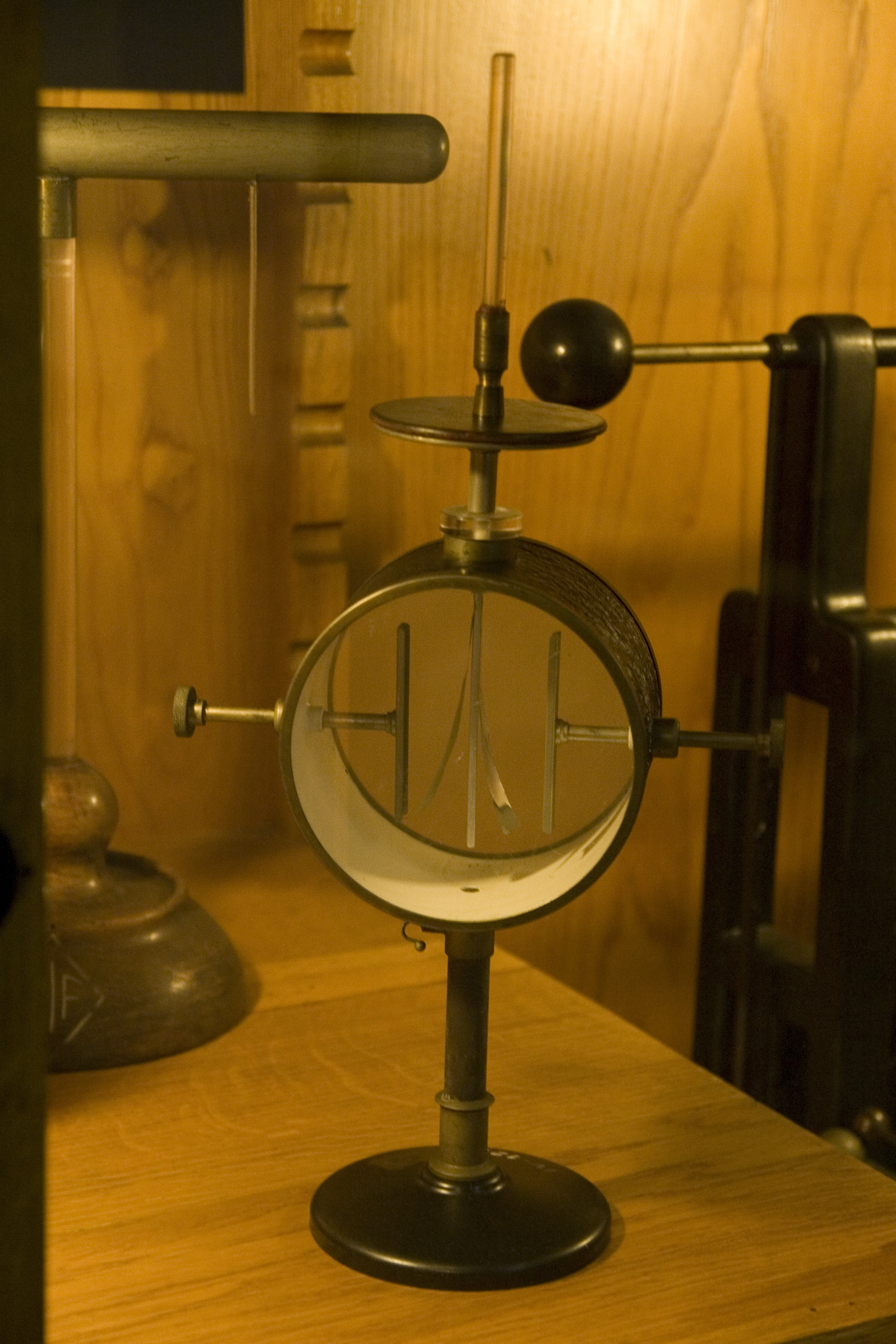
Condensing electroscope, Rome University physics dept.

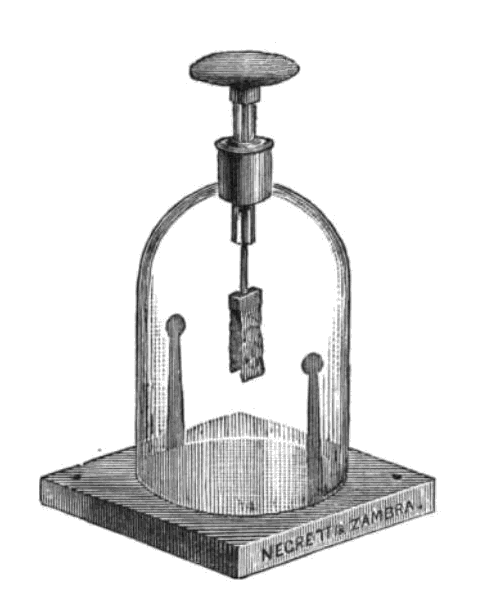
Electroscope from about 1910 with grounding electrodes inside jar, as described above

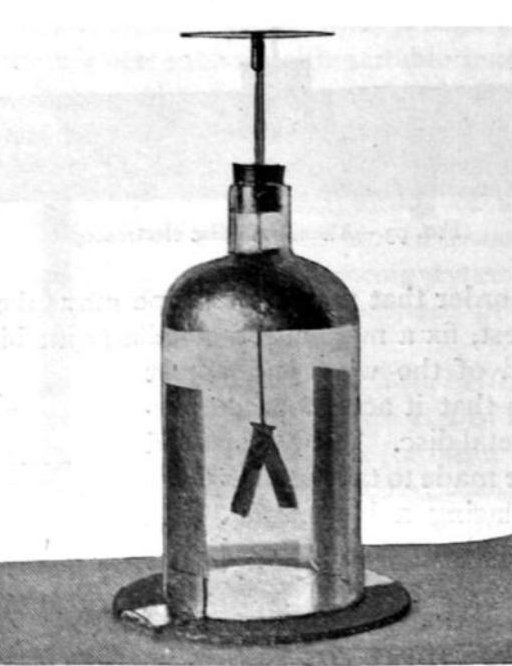
Homemade electroscope, 1900

== See also ==
- Electrical measurements
- Electrostatic fieldmeter
- Faraday cup electrometer
- Radiation
