= Faraday cup =

Charged particle catcher

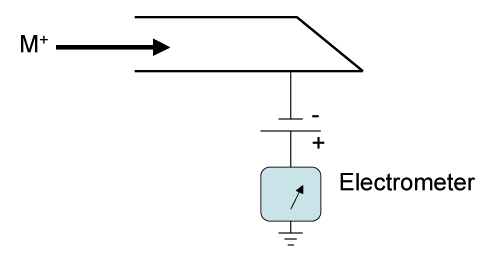
- Schematic diagram of a Faraday cup
- Uses: Charged particle detector
- Related items: Electron multiplier Microchannel plate detector Daly detector

A Faraday cup is a metal (conductive) cup designed to catch charged particles. The resulting current can be measured and used to determine the number of ions or electrons hitting the cup. The Faraday cup was named after Michael Faraday who first theorized ions around 1830.

Examples of devices which use Faraday cups include space probes (Voyager 1, & 2, Parker Solar Probe, etc.) and mass spectrometers. Faraday cups can also be used to measure charged aerosol particles.

== Principle of operation ==
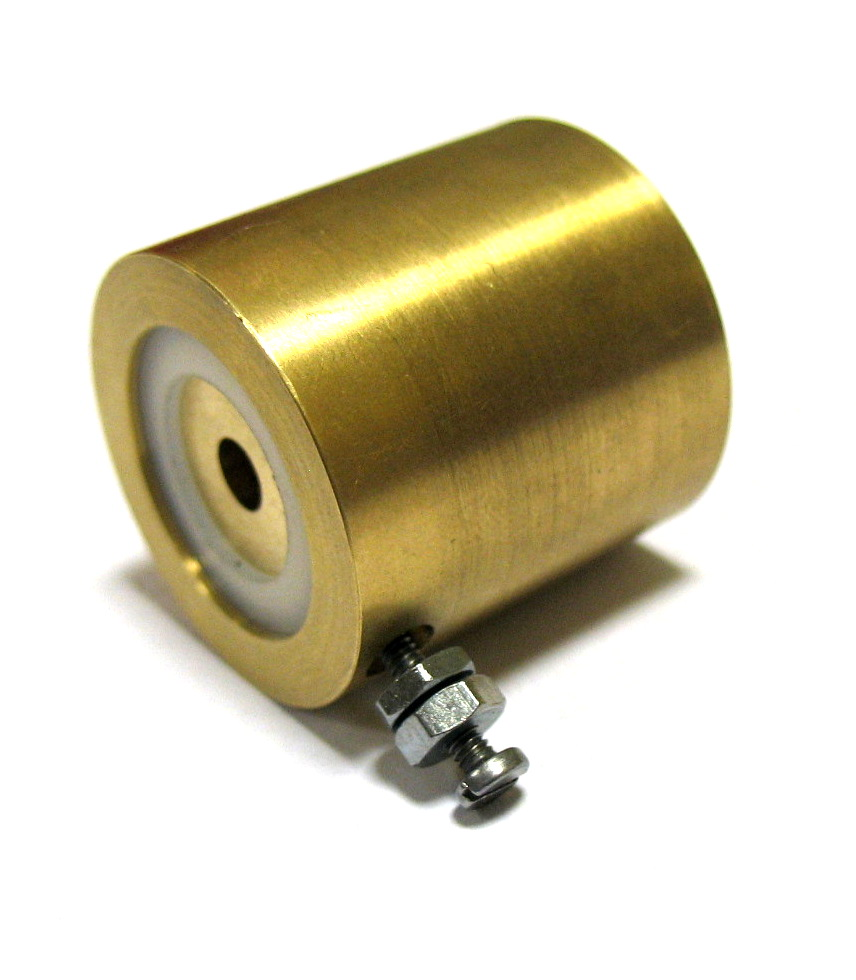
Faraday cup with an electron-suppressor plate in front

When a beam or packet of ions or electrons (e.g. from an electron beam) hits the metallic body of the cup, the apparatus gains a small net charge. The cup can then be discharged to measure a small current proportional to the charge carried by the impinging ions or electrons. By measuring the electric current (the number of electrons flowing through the circuit per second) in the cup, the number of charges can be determined. For a continuous beam of ions (assumed to be singly charged) or electrons, the total number N hitting the cup per unit time (in seconds) is

$$\frac {N}{t} = \frac {I}{e}$$

where I is the measured current (in amperes) and e is the elementary charge (1.60 × 10^{−19} C). Thus, a measured current of one nanoamp (10^{−9} A) corresponds to about 6 billion singly charged particles striking the Faraday cup each second.

Faraday cups are not as sensitive as electron multiplier detectors, but are highly regarded for accuracy because of the direct relation between the measured current and number of ions.

== In plasma diagnostics ==
The Faraday cup uses a physical principle according to which the electrical charges delivered to the inner surface of a hollow conductor are redistributed around its outer surface due to mutual self-repelling of charges of the same sign – a phenomenon discovered by Faraday.

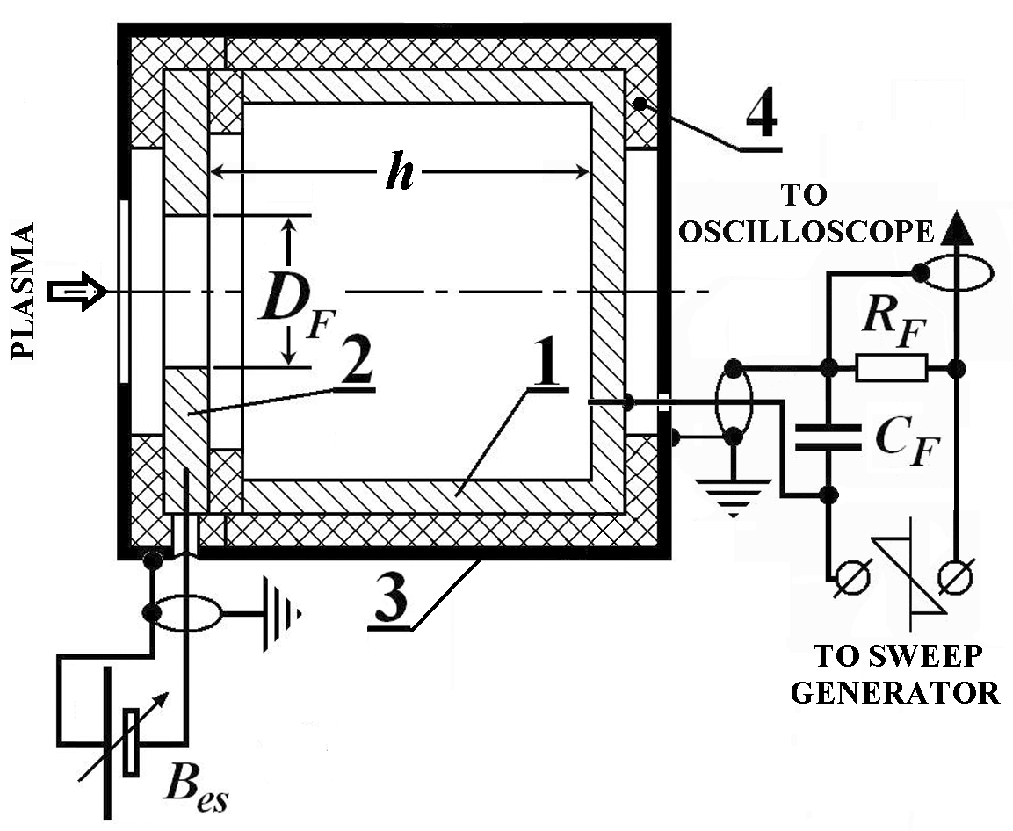
Fig. 1. Faraday cup for plasma diagnostics 1 – cup-receiver, metal (stainless steel). 2 – electron-suppressor lid, metal (stainless steel). 3 – grounded shield, metal (stainless steel). 4 – insulator (teflon, ceramic).

The conventional Faraday cup is applied for measurements of ion (or electron) flows from plasma boundaries and comprises a metallic cylindrical receiver-cup – 1 (Fig. 1) closed with, and insulated from, a washer-type metallic electron-suppressor lid – 2 provided with the round axial through enter-hollow of an aperture with a surface area $S_F=\pi D^2_F/4$. Both the receiver cup and the electron-suppressor lid are enveloped in, and insulated from, a grounded cylindrical shield – 3 having an axial round hole coinciding with the hole in the electron-suppressor lid – 2. The electron-suppressor lid is connected by 50 Ω RF cable with the source $B_{es}$ of variable DC voltage $U_{es}$. The receiver-cup is connected by 50 Ω RF cable through the load resistor $R_F$ with a sweep generator producing saw-type pulses $U_g(t)$. Electric capacity $C_F$ is formed of the capacity of the receiver-cup – 1 to the grounded shield – 3 and the capacity of the RF cable. The signal from $R_F$ enables an observer to acquire an I-V characteristic of the Faraday cup by oscilloscope. Proper operating conditions: $h\geq D_F$ (due to possible potential sag) and $h\ll \lambda_i$, where $\lambda_i$ is the ion free path. Signal from $R_F$ is the Faraday cup I-V characteristic which can be observed and memorized by oscilloscope

$i_\Sigma(U_g)=i_i(U_g)-C_F\frac{dU_g}{dt}$	1

In Fig. 1: 1 – cup-receiver, metal (stainless steel). 2 – electron-suppressor lid, metal (stainless steel). 3 – grounded shield, metal (stainless steel). 4 – insulator (teflon, ceramic). $C_F$ – capacity of Faraday cup. $R_F$ – load resistor.

Thus we measure the sum $i_\Sigma$ of the electric currents through the load resistor $R_F$: $i_i$ (Faraday cup current) plus the current $i_c(U_g)=-C_F(dU_g/ dt)$ induced through the capacitor $C_F$ by the saw-type voltage $U_g$of the sweep-generator: The current component $i_c(U_g)$ can be measured at the absence of the ion flow and can be subtracted further from the total current $i_\Sigma(U_g)$ measured with plasma to obtain the actual Faraday cup I-V characteristic $i_i(U_g)$ for processing. All of the Faraday cup elements and their assembly that interact with plasma are fabricated usually of temperature-resistant materials (often these are stainless steel and teflon or ceramic for insulators). For processing of the Faraday cup I-V characteristic, we are going to assume that the Faraday cup is installed far enough away from an investigated plasma source where the flow of ions could be considered as the flow of particles with parallel velocities directed exactly along the Faraday cup axis. In this case, the elementary particle current $di_i$ corresponding to the ion density differential $dn(v)$ in the range of velocities between $v$ and $v+dv$ of ions flowing in through operating aperture $S_F$ of the electron-suppressor can be written in the form

$di_i=eZ_i S_F vdn(v)$	2

where

$dn(v)=nf(v) dv$	3

$e$ is elementary charge, $Z_i$ is the ion charge state, and $f(v)$ is the one-dimensional ion velocity distribution function. Therefore, the ion current at the ion-decelerating voltage $U_g$ of the Faraday cup can be calculated by integrating Eq. (2) after substituting Eq. (3),

$i_i(U_g)=eZ_i n_i S_F\int\limits_{\sqrt{2eZ_i U_g /M_i}}^{\infty} f(v)vdv$	4

where the lower integration limit is defined from the equation $M_iv^2 _{i,s}/2=eZ_i U_g$ where $v_{i,s}$ is the velocity of the ion stopped by the decelerating potential $U_g$, and $M_i$ is the ion mass. Thus Eq. (4) represents the I-V characteristic of the Faraday cup. Differentiating Eq. (4) with respect to $U_g$, one can obtain the relation

$\frac{di_i(U_g)}{dU_g} = -en_i S_F \frac{eZ_i}{M_i}f\left(\sqrt{\frac{2eZ_i U_g}{M_i} }\right)$	5

where the value $-n_i S_F (eZ_i/M_i ) = C_i$ is an invariable constant for each measurement. Therefore, the average velocity $\langle v_i \rangle$ of ions arriving into the Faraday cup and their average energy $\langle \mathcal{E}_i \rangle$ can be calculated (under the assumption that we operate with a single type of ion) by the expressions

$\langle v_i \rangle = 1.389\times10^6 \sqrt{\frac{Z_i}{M_A}}\int\limits_0^\infty i^\prime _i (U_g)dU_g \left ( \int\limits_0^\infty \frac{i^\prime _i}{\sqrt{U_g}}dU_g \right )^{-1}$ [cm/s]	6

$\langle \mathcal{E}_i \rangle = \int\limits_0^\infty i^\prime _i (U_g) \sqrt{U_g}dU_g \left ( \int\limits_0^\infty \frac{i^\prime _i}{\sqrt{U_g}}dU_g \right )^{-1}$ [eV]	7

where $M_A$ is the ion mass in atomic units. The ion concentration $n_i$ in the ion flow at the Faraday cup vicinity can be calculated by the formula

$n_i = \frac{i_i (0)}{eZ_i \langle v_i \rangle S_F}$	8

which follows from Eq. (4) at $U_g = 0$,

$\int\limits_0^\infty f(v)vdv = \langle v \rangle$	9

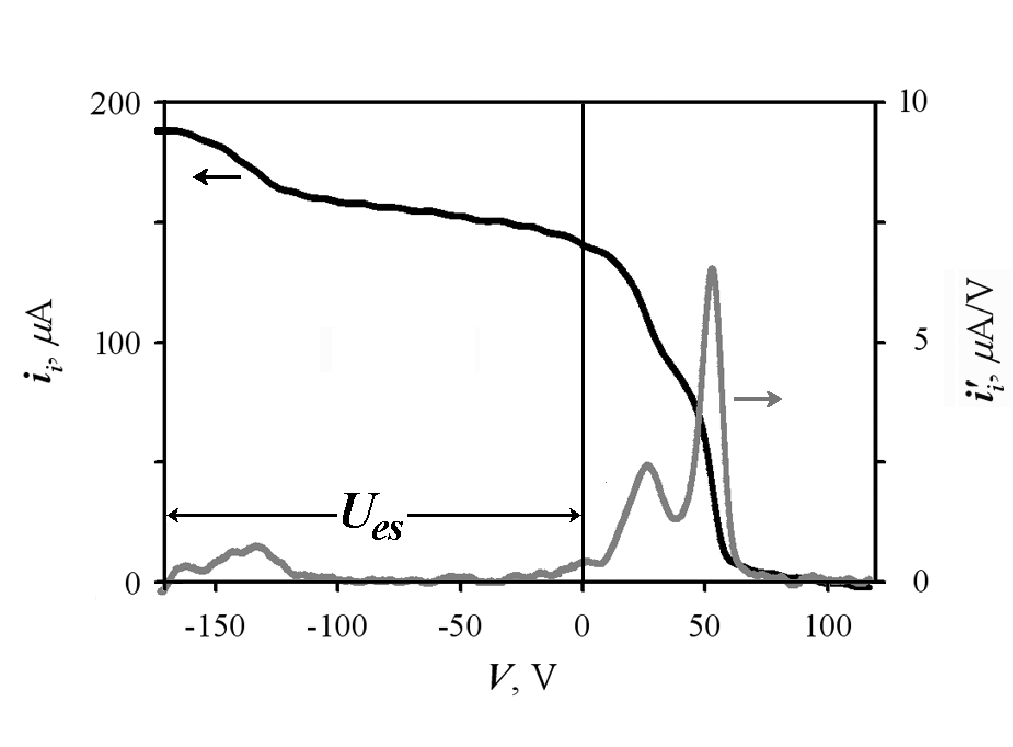
Fig, 2. Faraday cup I-V characteristic

and from the conventional condition for distribution function normalizing

$\int\limits_0^\infty f(v)dv = 1$	10

Fig. 2 illustrates the I-V characteristic $i_i (V)$ and its first derivative $i^\prime _i (V)$ of the Faraday cup with $S_F = 0.5 cm^2$ installed at output of the Inductively coupled plasma source powered with RF 13.56 MHz and operating at 6 mTorr of H2. The value of the electron-suppressor voltage (accelerating the ions) was set experimentally at $U_{es} = - 170 V$, near the point of suppression of the secondary electron emission from the inner surface of the Faraday cup.

== Error sources ==
The counting of charges collected per unit time is impacted by two error sources: 1) the emission of low-energy secondary electrons from the surface struck by the incident charge and 2) backscattering (~180 degree scattering) of the incident particle, which causes it to leave the collecting surface, at least temporarily. Especially with electrons, it is fundamentally impossible to distinguish between a fresh new incident electron and one that has been backscattered or even a fast secondary electron.

== See also ==
- Nanocoulombmeter
- Electron multiplier
- Microchannel plate detector
- Daly detector
- Faraday cup electrometer
- Faraday cage
- Faraday constant
- SWEAP
