= Vector voltmeter =

Two channel voltmeter that also measures phase

A vector voltmeter is a two-channel high-frequency sampling voltmeter that measures phase as well as voltage of two input signals of the same frequency.
