= Distributed amplifier =

Distributed amplifiers are circuit designs that incorporate transmission line theory into traditional amplifier design to obtain a larger gain-bandwidth product than is realizable by conventional circuits.

N-stage traveling-wave amplifier

== History ==
The design of the distributed amplifiers was first formulated by William S. Percival in 1936. In that year Percival proposed a design by which the transconductances of individual vacuum tubes could be added linearly without lumping their element capacitances at the input and output, thus arriving at a circuit that achieved a gain-bandwidth product greater than that of an individual tube. Percival's design did not gain widespread awareness however, until a publication on the subject was authored by Ginzton, Hewlett, Jasberg, and Noe in 1948. It is to this later paper that the term distributed amplifier can actually be traced. Traditionally, DA design architectures were realized using vacuum tube technology.

== Current technology ==
More recently, III-V semiconductor technologies, such as GaAs and InP have been used. These have superior performance resulting from higher bandgaps (higher electron mobility), higher saturated electron velocity, higher breakdown voltages and higher-resistivity substrates. The latter contributes much to the availability of higher quality-factor (Q-factor or simply Q) integrated passive devices in the III-V semiconductor technologies.

To meet the marketplace demands on cost, size, and power consumption of monolithic microwave integrated circuits (MMICs), research continues in the development of mainstream digital bulk-CMOS processes for such purposes. The continuous scaling of feature sizes in current IC technologies has enabled microwave and mm-wave CMOS circuits to directly benefit from the resulting increased unity-gain frequencies of the scaled technology. This device scaling, along with the advanced process control available in today's technologies, has recently made it possible to reach a transition frequency (f_{t}) of 170 GHz and a maximum oscillation frequency (fmax) of 240 GHz in a 90 nm CMOS process.

== Theory of operation ==
The operation of the DA can perhaps be most easily understood when explained in terms of the traveling-wave tube amplifier (TWTA). The DA consists of a pair of transmission lines with characteristic impedances of Z_{0} independently connecting the inputs and outputs of several active devices. An RF signal is thus supplied to the section of transmission line connected to the input of the first device. As the input signal propagates down the input line, the individual devices respond to the forward traveling input step by inducing an amplified complementary forward traveling wave on the output line. This assumes the delays of the input and output lines are made equal through selection of propagation constants and lengths of the two lines and as such the output signals from each individual device sum in phase. Terminating resistors Z_{g} and Z_{d} are placed to minimize destructive reflections.

The transconductive gain of each device is g_{m} and the output impedance seen by each transistor is half the characteristic impedance of the transmission line. So that the overall voltage gain of the DA is:

A_{v} = ½ n·g_{m}·Z_{0}, where n is the number of stages.

Neglecting losses, the gain demonstrates a linear dependence on the number of devices (stages). Unlike the multiplicative nature of a cascade of conventional amplifiers, the DA demonstrates an additive quality. It is this synergistic property of the DA architecture that makes it possible for it to provide gain at frequencies beyond that of the unity-gain frequency of the individual stages. In practice, the number of stages is limited by the diminishing input signal resulting from attenuation on the input line. Means of determining the optimal number of stages are discussed below. Bandwidth is typically limited by impedance mismatches brought about by frequency dependent device parasitics.

The DA architecture introduces delay in order to achieve its broadband gain characteristics. This delay is a desired feature in the design of another distributive system called the distributed oscillator.

== Lumped elements ==
Delay lines are made of lumped elements of L and C. The parasitic L and the C from the transistors are used for this and usually some L is added to raise the line impedance. Because of the Miller effect in the common source amplifier the input and the output transmission line are coupled. For example, for voltage inverting and current amplifying the input and the output form a shielded balanced line. The current is increasing in the output transmission line with every subsequent transistor, and therefore less and less L is added to keep the voltage constant and more and more extra C is added to keep the velocity constant. This C can come from parasitics of a second stage. These delay lines do not have a flat dispersion near their cut off, so it is important to use the same L-C periodicity in the input and the output. If inserting transmission lines, input and output will disperse away from each other.

For a distributed amplifier the input is fed in series into the amplifiers and parallel out of them. To avoid losses in the input, no input signal is allowed to leak through. This is avoided by using a balanced input and output also known as push–pull amplifier. Then all signals which leak through the parasitic capacitances cancel. The output is combined in a delay line with decreasing impedance. For narrow band operation other methods of phase-matching are possible, which avoid feeding the signal through multiple coils and capacitors. This may be useful for power-amplifiers.

The single amplifiers can be of any class. There may be some synergy between distributed class E/F amplifiers and some phase-matching methods. Only the fundamental frequency is used in the end, so this is the only frequency, which travels through the delay line version.

Because of the Miller effect a common source transistor acts as a capacitor (non inverting) at high frequencies and has an inverting transconductance at low frequencies. The channel of the transistor has three dimensions. One dimension, the width, is chosen depending on the current needed. The trouble is for a single transistor parasitic capacitance and gain both scale linearly with the width. For the distributed amplifier the capacitance – that is the width – of the single transistor is chosen based on the highest frequency and the width needed for the current is split across all transistors.

== Applications ==
Note that those termination resistors are usually not used in CMOS, but the losses due to these are small in typical applications. In solid state power amplifiers often multiple discrete transistors are used for power reasons anyway. If all transistors are driven in a synchronized fashion a very high gate drive power is needed. For frequencies at which small and efficient coils are available distributed amplifiers are more efficient.

Voltage can be amplified by a common gate transistor, which shows no miller effect and no unit gain frequency cut off. Adding this yields the cascode configuration. The common gate configuration is incompatible with CMOS; it adds a resistor, that means loss, and is more suited for broadband than for high efficiency applications.

- Radio
- Acousto-optic modulator
- time to digital converter

== See also ==
- Gunn diode is a device without any parasitic C or L very suitable for broadband applications
- Regenerative circuit is circuit using the parasitics of a single transistor for a high frequency narrow band amplifier
- Armstrong oscillator is circuit using the parasitics of a single transistor for a high frequency narrow band oscillator
