= Electrostatic voltmeter =

Electrostatic voltmeter

Electrostatic voltmeter can refer to an electrostatic charge meter, known also as surface DC voltmeter, or to a voltmeter to measure large electrical potentials, traditionally called electrostatic voltmeter.

== Charge meter ==
A surface DC voltmeter is an instrument that measures voltage with no electric charge transfer.

It can accurately measure surface potential (voltage) on materials without making physical contact, and so there is no electrostatic charge transfer or loading of the voltage source.

=== Explanation ===
Many voltage measurements cannot be made using conventional contacting voltmeters because they require charge transfer to the voltmeter, thus causing loading and modification of the source voltage. For example, when measuring voltage distribution on a dielectric surface, any measurement technique that requires charge transfer, no matter how small, will modify or destroy the actual data.

=== Principle of operation ===
In practice, an electrostatic charge monitoring probe is placed close (1 mm to 5 mm) to the surface to be measured, and the probe body is driven to the same potential as the measured unknown by an electronic circuit. This achieves a high-accuracy measurement that is virtually insensitive to variations in probe-to-surface distances. The technique also prevents arc-over between the probe and measured surface when measuring high voltages.

== Voltmeter ==
Electrostatic voltmeter operation

Electrostatic voltmeter mechanism Note the curved plates (sectors) toward upper left

The operating principle of an electrostatic voltmeter is similar to that of an electrometer; it is, however, designed to measure high potential differences, typically from a few hundred to many thousands volts.

=== Principle of operation ===
An electrostatic voltmeter uses the attraction force between two charged surfaces to create a deflection of a pointer directly calibrated in volts. Since the attraction force is the same regardless of the polarity of the charged surfaces (as long as the charge is opposite), the electrostatic voltmeter can measure DC voltages of either polarity.

Typical construction is shown in the drawing. The pivoted sector NN is attracted to the fixed sector QQ. The small weight w counterbalances the moving sector and indicates the voltage by the pointer P. In newer instruments, the weight is replaced by a spring, thus allowing the meter to be used in horizontal and vertical positions; this form is shown in the photograph. The fixed sector is insulated from the rest of the meter. The butterfly-shaped moving sector is made of thin aluminum foil. To minimize high electrical stress, the fixed and moving sectors are highly polished without sharp corners. An electrostatic voltmeter uses the attraction force between two charged surfaces to create a deflection of a pointer directly calibrated in volts.

Since the attraction force is the same regardless of the polarity of the charged surfaces (as long as the charge is opposite), the electrostatic voltmeter can measure DC voltages of either polarity. The instrument will draw negligible current from a DC source. It can also be used on AC and will draw a small current due to the capacitance of the rotor system. To reduce the torque required and improve the sensitivity and speed of response, a small mirror attached to the rotor may replace the pointer with a light beam deflected by it over a scale.
