= Electrometer =

Instrument for measuring electric charge

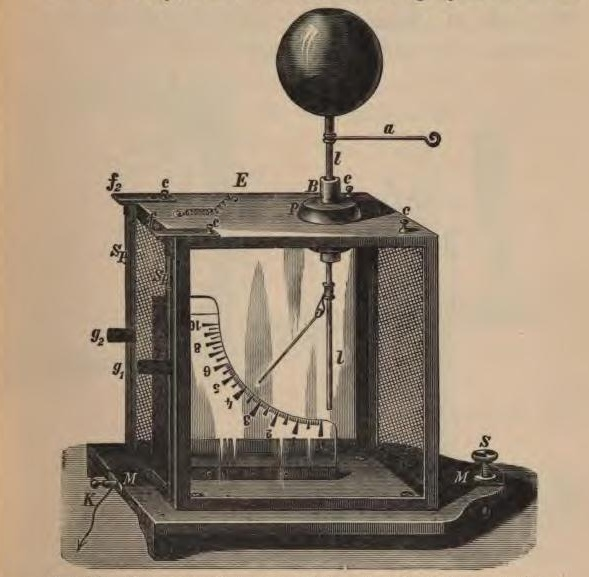
Kolbe electrometer, precision form of gold-leaf instrument. This has a light pivoted aluminum vane hanging next to a vertical metal plate. When charged the vane is repelled by the plate and hangs at an angle.

An electrometer is an electrical instrument for measuring electric charge or electrical potential difference. There are many different types, ranging from historical handmade mechanical instruments to high-precision electronic devices. Modern electrometers based on vacuum tube or solid-state technology can be used to make voltage and charge measurements with very low leakage currents, down to 1 femtoampere. A simpler but related instrument, the electroscope, works on similar principles but only indicates the relative magnitudes of voltages or charges.

== Historical electrometers ==
=== Gold-leaf electroscope ===
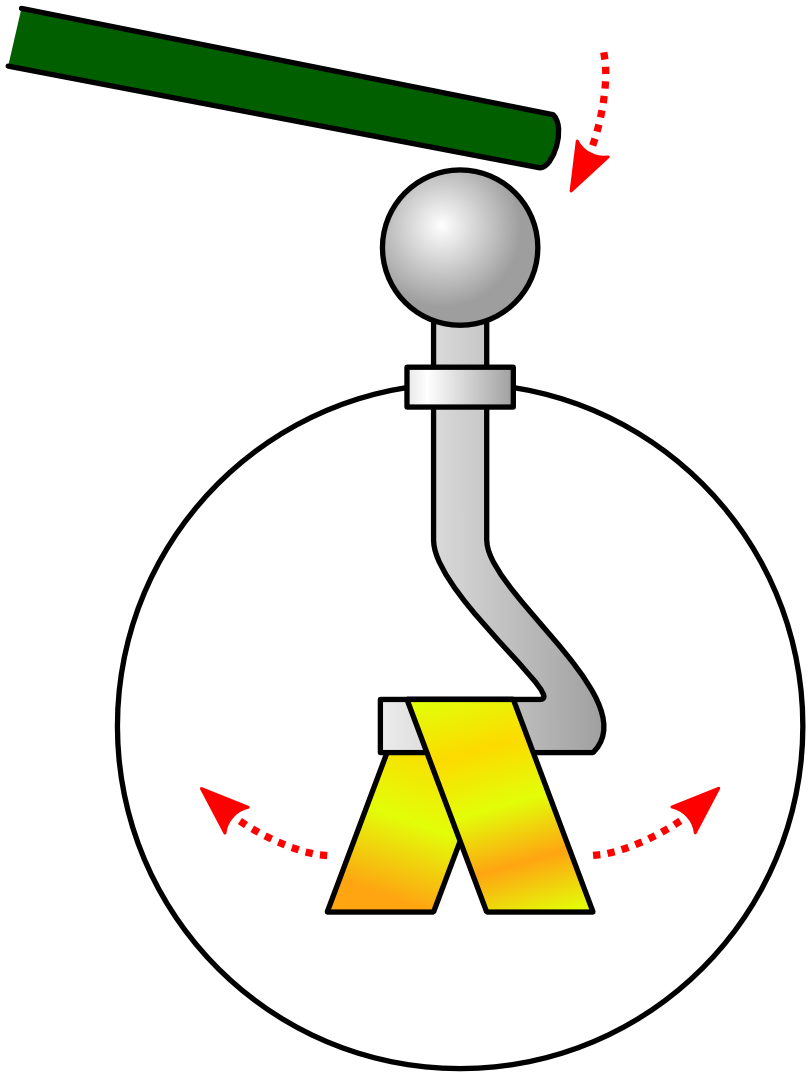
Gold-leaf electroscope

The gold-leaf electroscope was one of the instruments used to indicate electric charge. It is still used for science demonstrations but has been superseded in most applications by electronic measuring instruments. The instrument consists of two thin leaves of gold foil suspended from an electrode. When the electrode is charged by induction or by contact, the leaves acquire similar electric charges and repel each other due to the Coulomb force. Their separation is a direct indication of the net charge stored on them. On the glass opposite the leaves, pieces of tin foil may be pasted, so that when the leaves diverge fully they may discharge into the ground. The leaves may be enclosed in a glass envelope to protect them from drafts, and the envelope may be evacuated to minimize charge leakage. This principle has been used to detect ionizing radiation, as seen in the quartz fibre electrometer and Kearny fallout meter.

This type of electroscope usually acts as an indicator and not a measuring device, although it can be calibrated. A calibrated electrometer with a more robust aluminium indicator was invented by Ferdinand Braun and first described in 1887. According to Braun, the standard gold-leaf electrometer is good up to about 800 V with a resolution of 0.1 V using an ocular micrometer. For larger voltages up to 4–6 kV Braun's instrument can achieve a resolution of 10 V.

The instrument was developed in the 18th century by several researchers, among them Abraham Bennet (1787) and Alessandro Volta.

=== Early quadrant electrometer ===
Early quadrant electrometer.

While the term "quadrant electrometer" eventually referred to Kelvin's version, this term was first used to describe a simpler device. Its body consists of an upright stem of wood affixed to a semicircle of ivory with angle markings. A light cork ball hangs by a string from a pivot at the center of the semicircle and makes contact with the stem. When the instrument is placed upon a charged body, the stem and ball become charged and repel each other. The amount of repulsion is quantified by reading the angle between the string and the stem off the semicircle, though the measured angle is not in direct proportion to the charge. Early inventors included William Henley (1770) and Horace-Bénédict de Saussure.

=== Coulomb's electrometer ===
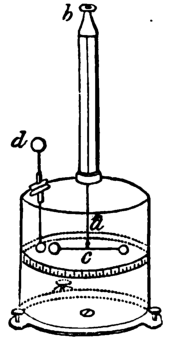
Coulomb electrometer

Torsion is used to give a measurement more sensitive than repulsion of gold leaves or cork-balls. It consists of a glass cylinder with a glass tube on top. In the axes of the tube is a glass thread, the lower end of this holds a bar of gum lac, with a gilt pith ball at each extremity. Through another aperture on the cylinder, another gum lac rod with gilt balls may be introduced. This is called the carrier rod.

If the lower ball of the carrier rod is charged when it is entered into the aperture, this will repel one of the movable balls inside. An index and scale (not pictured) is attached to the top of the twistable glass rod. The number of degrees twisted to bring the balls back together is in exact proportion of the amount of charge of the ball of the carrier rod.

Francis Ronalds, the inaugural Director of the Kew Observatory, made important improvements to the Coulomb torsion balance around 1844 and the modified instrument was sold by London instrument-makers. Ronalds used a thin suspended needle rather than the gum lac bar and replaced the carrier rod with a fixed piece in the plane of the needle. Both were metal, as was the suspending line and its surrounding tube, so that the needle and the fixed piece could be charged directly through wire connections. Ronalds also employed a Faraday cage and trialled photography to record the readings continuously. It was the forerunner of Kelvin's quadrant electrometer (described below).

=== Peltier electrometer ===
Developed by Peltier, this uses a form of magnetic compass to measure deflection by balancing the electrostatic force with a magnetic needle.

=== Bohnenberger electrometer ===
The Bohnenberger electrometer, developed by J. G. F. von Bohnenberger from an invention by T. G. B. Behrens, consists of a single gold leaf suspended vertically between the anode and cathode of a dry pile. Any charge imparted to the gold leaf causes it to move toward one or the other pole; thus, the sign of the charge as well as its approximate magnitude may be gauged.

=== Attraction electrometer ===
Also known as "attracted disk electrometers", attraction electrometers are sensitive balances measuring the attraction between charged disks. William Snow Harris is credited with the invention of this instrument, which was further improved by Lord Kelvin.

=== Kelvin's quadrant electrometer ===
Lord Kelvin's Quadrant Electrometer

Developed by Lord Kelvin, this is the most sensitive and accurate of all the mechanical electrometers. The original design uses a light aluminum sector suspended inside a drum cut into four segments. The segments are insulated and connected diagonally in pairs. The charged aluminum sector is attracted to one pair of segments and repelled from the other. The deflection is observed by a beam of light reflected from a small mirror attached to the sector, just as in a galvanometer. The engraving on the right shows a slightly different form of this electrometer, using four flat plates rather than closed segments. The plates can be connected externally in the conventional diagonal way (as shown), or in a different order for specific applications.

A more sensitive form of quadrant electrometer was developed by Frederick Lindemann. It employs a metal-coated quartz fiber instead of an aluminum sector. The deflection is measured by observing the movement of the fiber under a microscope. Initially used for measuring star light, it was employed for the infrared detection of airplanes in the early stages of World War II.

Some mechanical electrometers were housed inside a cage often referred to as a “bird cage”. This is a form of Faraday Cage that protected the instrument from external electrostatic charges.

=== Electrograph ===
Electricity readings may be recorded continuously with a device known as an electrograph. Francis Ronalds created an early electrograph around 1814 in which the changing electricity made a pattern in a rotating resin-coated plate. It was employed at Kew Observatory and the Royal Observatory, Greenwich in the 1840s to create records of variations in atmospheric electricity. In 1845, Ronalds invented photographic means of registering the atmospheric electricity. The photosensitive surface was pulled slowly past of the aperture diaphragm of the camera box, which also housed an electrometer, and captured ongoing movements of the electrometer indices as a trace. Kelvin used similar photographic means for his quadrant electrometer (see above) in the 1860s.

== Modern electrometers ==
A modern electrometer is a highly sensitive electronic voltmeter whose input impedance is so high that the current flowing into it can be considered, for most practical purposes, to be zero. The actual value of input resistance for modern electronic electrometers is around 10^{14}Ω, compared to around 10^{10}Ω for nanovoltmeters. Owing to the extremely high input impedance, special design considerations (such as driven shields and special insulation materials) must be applied to avoid leakage current.

Among other applications, electrometers are used in nuclear physics experiments as they are able to measure the tiny charges left in matter by the passage of ionizing radiation. The most common use for modern electrometers is the measurement of radiation with ionization chambers, in instruments such as geiger counters.

=== Vibrating reed electrometers ===
Vibrating reed electrometers use a variable capacitor formed between a moving electrode (in the form of a vibrating reed) and a fixed input electrode. As the distance between the two electrodes varies, the capacitance also varies and electric charge is forced in and out of the capacitor. The alternating current signal produced by the flow of this charge is amplified and used as an analogue for the DC voltage applied to the capacitor. The DC input resistance of the electrometer is determined solely by the leakage resistance of the capacitor, and is typically extremely high, (although its AC input impedance is lower).

For convenience of use, the vibrating reed assembly is often attached by a cable to the rest of the electrometer. This allows for a relatively small unit to be located near the charge to be measured while the much larger reed-driver and amplifier unit can be located wherever it is convenient for the operator.

=== Valve electrometers ===
Valve electrometers use a specialized vacuum tube (thermionic valve) with a very high gain (transconductance) and input resistance. The input current is allowed to flow into the high impedance grid, and the voltage so generated is vastly amplified in the anode (plate) circuit. Valves designed for electrometer use have leakage currents as low as a few femtoamperes (10^{−15} amperes). Such valves must be handled with gloved hands as the salts left on the glass envelope can provide leakage paths for these tiny currents.

In a specialized circuit called inverted triode, the roles of anode and grid are reversed. This places the control electrode at a maximum distance from the space-charge region surrounding the filament, minimizing the number of electrons collected by the control electrode, and thus minimizing the input current.

=== Solid-state electrometers ===
The most modern electrometers consist of a solid state amplifier using one or more field-effect transistors, connections for external measurement devices, and usually a display and/or data-logging connections. The amplifier amplifies small currents so that they are more easily measured. The external connections are usually of a co-axial or tri-axial design, and allow attachment of diodes or ionization chambers for ionising radiation measurement. The display or data-logging connections allow the user to see the data or record it for later analysis. Electrometers designed for use with ionization chambers may include a high-voltage power supply, which is used to bias the ionization chamber.

Solid-state electrometers are often multipurpose devices that can measure voltage, charge, resistance and current. They measure voltage by means of "voltage balancing", in which the input voltage is compared with an internal reference voltage source using an electronic circuit with a very high input impedance (of the order of 10^{14} Ω). A similar circuit modified to act as a current-to-voltage converter enables the instrument to measure currents as small as a few femtoamperes. Combined with an internal voltage source, the current measuring mode can be adapted to measure very high resistances, of the order of 10^{17} Ω. Finally, by calculation from the known capacitance of the electrometer's input terminal, the instrument can measure very small electric charges, down to a small fraction of a picocoulomb.

== See also ==
- Electrical measurements
- Electron
- Electroscope
- Radiation
- Faraday cup electrometer
