= Daly detector =

Type of gas-phase ion detector

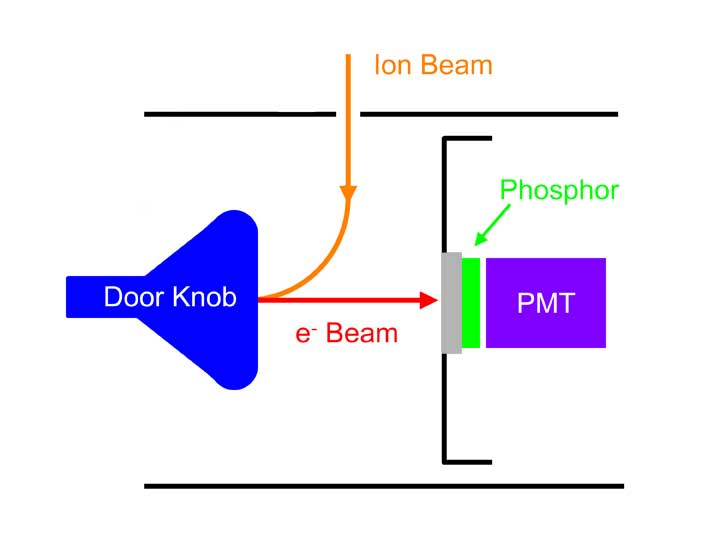
- Schematic of a Daly detector
- Inventor: Norman Richard Daly
- Related items: Microchannel plate detector Electron multiplier

A Daly detector is a gas-phase ion detector that consists of a metal "doorknob", a scintillator (phosphor screen) and a photomultiplier. It was named after its inventor Norman Richard Daly. Daly detectors are typically used in mass spectrometers.

== Principle of operation ==
Ions that hit the doorknob release secondary electrons. A high voltage (about −20000 V) between the doorknob and the scintillator accelerates the electrons onto the phosphor screen, where they are converted to photons. These photons are detected by the photomultiplier.

The advantage of the Daly detector is that the photomultiplier can be separated by a window, which lets the photons through from the high vacuum of the mass spectrometer, thus preventing an otherwise possible contamination and extending life span of the detector. The Daly detector also allows a higher acceleration after the field-free region of a time-of-flight mass spectrometer flight tube, which can improve the sensitivity for heavy ions.

== Norman Richard Daly ==
Norman Daly was awarded 6 patents in the years 1962–1973 relating to ion detection and mass spectrometers, from his work at the United Kingdom Atomic Energy Authority.
