= Faraday cup electrometer =

Form of an electrical aerosol instrument used in aerosol studies

The Faraday cup electrometer is the simplest form of an electrical aerosol instrument used in aerosol studies. It consists of an electrometer and a filter inside a Faraday cage. Charged particles collected by the filter generate an electric current which is measured by the electrometer.

== Principle ==
According to Gauss' law, the charge collected on the Faraday cup is the induced charge, that means that the filter does not need to be a conductor. It is typically used to measure particles of unipolar charge, which are particles with a net charge concentration that equals the charge concentration of positively or negatively charged particles.

With an aerosol electrometer the transportation of charge by electrical charged aerosol particles can be measured as electric current.

In a metal housing (Faraday cup) a particle filter is mounted on an insulator. A Faraday cup is a detector that measures the current in a beam of charged (aerosol) particles. Faraday cups are used e.g. in mass spectrometers being an alternative to secondary electron multipliers. The advantage of the Faraday cup is its robustness and the possibility to measure the ion or electron stream absolutely. Furthermore, the sensitivity is constant by time and not mass-dependent. The simplest form is the following: A Faraday detector consists of a metal cup, that is placed in the path of the particle beam. The aerosol has to pass the filter inside the cup. The filter has to be isolated. It is connected to the electrometer circuit which measures the current.

== See also ==
- Michael Faraday
- Faraday cup
