= Shutter =

Shutter may refer to:

== Architecture ==
- Window shutter, a solid window covering used for light control, privacy, security, protection against weather, and to enhance the aesthetics of a building
- Roller shutter, a type of door or window shutter mainly used in retail shops, warehouses, and other facilities
- Hurricane shutter, a type of window shutter mainly used to prevent windows from being broken by flying objects during a storm

== Science and technology ==
- Shutter (photography), a photographic device that administers the exposure by limiting the time over which light is admitted
- Shutter, a device used to manipulate pulses of light in a signal lamp
- Movie projector shutter, used to interrupt the emitted light during the time the film is advanced to the next frame
- Remote shutter, in a selfie stick
- Stage lighting shutter, used to modify the light cast by a theatre light
- Bradbury–Nielsen shutter, a type of electrical ion gate that is used in the field of mass spectrometry

== Films ==
- Shutter (2004 film), a horror film from Thailand
- Shutter, a 2007 short film starring Sonja Bennett
- Shutter (2008 film), an American remake of the 2004 film, starring Joshua Jackson
- Shutter (2012 film), an Indian thriller film
- Shutter (2014 film), a Marathi-language thriller film

== People ==
- Rick Shutter, American drummer and percussionist

== See also ==
- Shuttering (disambiguation)
- Shudder (disambiguation)
