= Martin F. Jarrold =

American chemist

- Known for: Ion mobility spectrometry, Charge Detection Mass Spectrometry
- Awards: John B. Fenn Award (2018)
- Scientific career
- Fields: Analytical chemistry, Ion mobility spectrometry, Charge Detection Mass Spectrometry

Martin F. Jarrold is a physical and analytical chemist known for contributions to ion-mobility spectrometry, heat capacity measurements of metal clusters, and charge detection mass spectrometry. Martin is the Robert & Marjorie Mann Chair in the Department of Chemistry at Indiana University.

== Background ==
Martin F. Jarrold grew up in England. He attended the University of Warwick in Coventry, England and obtained both a Bachelor of Science (1977) and PhD (1980). Jarrold came to the United States as a NATO Postdoctoral Fellow at the University of California, Santa Barbara. Joining the Physics Research Division of AT&T Bell Laboratories in Murray Hill, New Jersey after UCSB. There, he focused on determining the physical and chemical properties of semiconductor clusters. In 1992, he became Professor of Chemistry at Northwestern University, and was later named Dow Chemical Company Research Professor in 2000. While at Northwestern, he worked on advanced mass spectrometry-based-methods to study peptides and proteins. In the summer of 2002, he moved to Indiana University as Professor and a Robert & Marjorie Mann Chair in the Department of Chemistry.

== Research ==
Jarrold's research focuses include use of ion-mobility spectrometry to analyze proteins, peptides, clusters, and other biomolecules. Through ion mobility spectrometry, his group was able to see deviations from the native state and different conformations (different protein folding modes). Some of Jarrold's more recent research has investigated the formation of viral capsids by analyzing the intermediates in their formation with charge detection mass spectrometry (CDMS). Jarrold has been involved in the publication of over 250 articles.

== Awards ==
On June 8, 2018, Jarrold received the John B. Fenn Award at the American Society for Mass Spectrometry Conference for his work in ion mobility spectrometry. This award is given to those who have made distinguished contributions to the mass spectrometry field.
