= Shuttering =

Shuttering may refer to:

- Formwork, used in concrete construction (UK usage)
- Window shutters, solid window coverings

== See also ==
- Shutter (disambiguation)
