= High-field asymmetric-waveform ion-mobility spectrometry =

Chemical analysis technique

High-field asymmetric-waveform ion mobility spectrometry (FAIMS or RF-DC ion mobility spectrometry) is an ion mobility spectrometry technique in which ions at atmospheric pressure are separated by the application of a high-voltage asymmetric waveform at radio frequency (RF) combined with a static (DC) waveform applied between two electrodes. Depending on the ratio of the high-field and low-field mobility of the ion, it will migrate toward one or the other electrode. Only ions with specific mobility will pass through the device.

== Application ==
One application of FAIMS is as an additional separation step between the liquid chromatography separation and mass spectrometric analysis in liquid chromatography–mass spectrometry (LC-MS) as used in proteomic studies. It allows for online fractionation of the analyte components to improve detection of peptides in complex samples. LC-MS uses the mass to charge ratio of peptide ions to analyse samples and the resulting spectra are compared to spectral reference libraries. FAIMS can be used to filter out "chemical noise", i.e. compounds whose spectra would interfere with the spectra of the desired compound, either by overlapping with the desired compound's spectra or adding additional peaks to the spectra. It can be used to filter out interfering ions and simultaneously select peptides with charge states that are optimal for analysis.

A further advantage of this technique is that it can be used to select for peptide ions that are of low abundance in the sample. Such low abundance ions are often not analysed because of the limitations of the duty cycles of the mass spectrometers. By selectively removing the more abundant ions FAIMS can assist in distinguishing between ions with similar mass to charge ratios and can prevent a more abundant ion from masking the presence of a less abundant ion.

== Devices ==
Devices utilizing the principle of RF-DC ion-mobility spectrometry include handheld explosive trace detectors "MO-2M" and "Pilot-M".

== See also ==
- Electrical mobility
- Ion mobility spectrometry
