= Angus Ewan Cameron =

American chemist

Angus Ewan "Gus" Cameron
- Born: October 14, 1906; Sylvania
- Died: September 27, 1981 (aged 74); Oak Ridge, Tennessee
- Education: Oberlin College; University of Minnesota
- Scientific career
- Fields: mass spectrometry, isotopic separation
- Workplaces: Oak Ridge National Laboratory
- Thesis: The Sorption of Bromide and of Iodine Vapor by Highly Activated Silica Gel and Coconut Charcoal (1932)
- Doctoral advisor: L. H. Reyerson

Angus Ewan Cameron (14 October 1906 - 27 September 1981) was an American chemist known for his work on isotopic enrichment of uranium-235 for the purpose of building atomic bombs and his research on mass spectrometry.

== Career and Research ==
Cameron was born in Sylvania, Pennsylvania and graduated from Oberlin College in 1928 (magna cum laude) and received his PhD from the University of Minnesota in physical chemistry in 1932. After working at the University of Rochester, he joined Kodak Research Laboratories to work on photographic processing. In 1943 he moved to what is now the Oak Ridge National Laboratory (at the time US AEC site). Much of his work was classified and not published at the time.

Cameron was involved in the effort to enrich the isotope uranium-235 by electromagnetic isotope separation, where he led a division of over 300 people and provided measurements of the isotopes of various uranium materials employed in the Manhattan Project during World War II. After the war, Cameron continued to work on uranium enrichment using gaseous diffusion and he led the Stable Isotopes Division from 1955 to 1957, before becoming section chief for mass spectrometry (1957 to 1960) and assistant director of the division (1960 to his retirement in 1971).

During his time at Oak Ridge National Laboratory, Cameron built a time of flight mass spectrometer with David Eggers and produced a mass spectrum of the mercury isotopes in 1944. He was also involved in the development of a gas chromatograph mass spectrometer the Viking Mission to Mars.

Cameron was elected to the International Commission on Atomic Weights (1959-1981) and the IUPAC Mass Spectrometric Evaluation Group and Sub-committee on Assessment of Isotopic Composition. He was the co-author of the 1962 Cameron-Wichers report that converted all atomic weight measurements for all chemical elements to the new Carbon-12 scale, solving a long-standing problem of conflicting atomic mass scales in the field.

Cameron died on September 27, 1981, in Oak Ridge, Tennessee. He was married to Gray Williams and had three sons, Allan W. Cameron, Douglas Cameron, and Alexander Cameron. He enjoyed sports, especially squash.
