= Viehland–Mason theory =

Atomic theory

The Viehland–Mason theory is a two-temperature theory for charged and neutral atoms, which explains how trace ions can have a substantially different temperature than dilute gas atoms. It is one of any of a number of kinetic theories of the transport of trace amounts of molecular ions through neutral gases under the influence of a uniform electrostatic field. Larry Viehland and Edward A. Mason developed it in the late 1970s. They later extended this theory into a three-temperature theory that allowed for different ion temperatures parallel and perpendicular to the electric field. Current work for atomic ion-neutral systems uses a Gram–Charlier probability function as a zero-order approximation to the ion velocity distribution function.

The Gram–Charlier theory has been remarkably successful in producing calculated mobilities and diffusion coefficients that are in excellent agreement with experimental results if the microscopic force between the ion and atom is accurately known over a wide range of separation. The Viehland–Mason theories for molecular ions in molecular gases are more elaborate than those for atoms, since the forces are angle-dependent and since internal degrees of freedom must be included. Theories have been developed using quantum-mechanical and semi-classical approaches, but there have been no numerical applications because it is extremely difficult to calculate the necessary cross-sections. To circumvent this difficulty, completely classical kinetic theories for atomic ions in non-vibrating (rigid rotor) diatomic gases and for non-vibrating diatomic ions in atomic or non-vibrating diatomic gases have been developed.
