= Bradbury–Nielsen shutter =

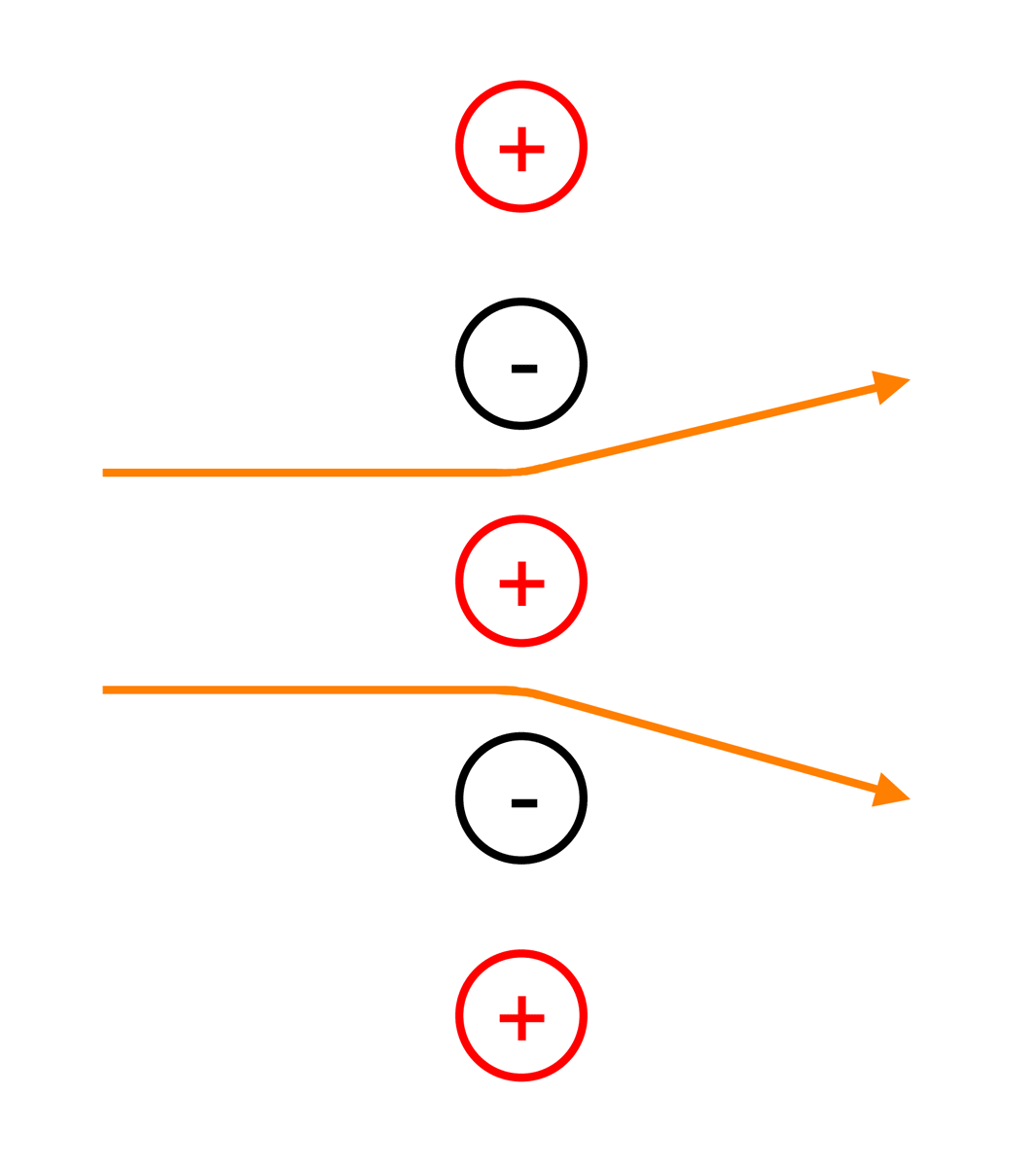
Schematic top view of a Bradbury-Nielsen shutter with voltages on (deflecting).

A Bradbury–Nielsen shutter (or Bradbury–Nielsen gate) is a type of electrical ion gate, which was first proposed in an article by Norris Bradbury and Russel A. Nielsen, where they used it as an electron filter. Today they are used in the field of mass spectrometry where they are used in both TOF mass spectrometers and in ion mobility spectrometers , as well as Hadamard transform mass spectrometers (a variant of TOF-MS). The Bradbury–Nielsen shutter is ideal for injecting short pulses of ions and can be used to improve the mass resolution of TOF instruments by reducing the initial pulse size as compared to other methods of ion injection.

== Theory of operation ==
The concept behind the Bradbury–Nielsen shutter is to apply a high frequency voltage in a 180° out-of-phase manner to alternate wires in a grid which is orthogonal to the path of the ion beam. This results in charged particles only passing directly through the shutter at certain times in the voltage phase (φ=nπ/2), when the potential difference between the grid wires is zero. At other times the ion beam is deflected to some angle by the potential difference between the neighboring wires. This deflection is divergent with ions that pass through alternate slits being deflected in opposite directions. The maximum deflection angle can be calculated by

tan α = k V_{p} / V_{0}

where α is the deflection angle, k is a deflection constant, V_{p} is the wire voltage (+V_{p} on one wire set and -V_{p} on the other), and V_{0} is the ion acceleration voltage in eV. The deflection constant k can be calculated by

k = π / 2ln[cot(πR/2d)]

where R is the wire radius and d is the wire spacing.

== Micromachined ion gates ==
A Bradbury-Nielsen Gate micromachined from a silicon on insulator wafer has been reported.

== See also ==
- Ion mobility spectrometer
- Time-of-flight
