= Ion mobility spectrometry =

Analytical technique used to separate and identify ionized molecules in the gas phase

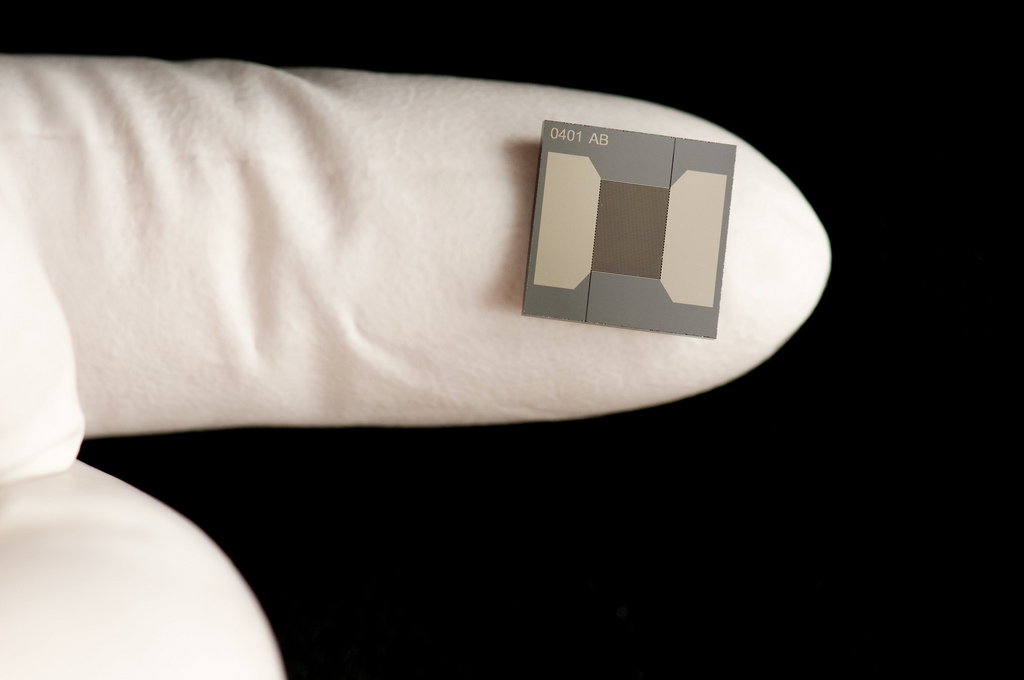
IMS chip at the U.S. Pacific Northwest National Laboratory: this dime-sized chip provides dozens of channels through which ions travel (perpendicular to plane of view) to be separated and identified

Ion mobility spectrometry (IMS) is a method of conducting analytical research that separates and identifies ionized molecules present in the gas phase based on the mobility of the molecules in a carrier buffer gas. Even though it is used extensively for military or security objectives, such as detecting drugs and explosives, the technology also has many applications in laboratory analysis, including studying small and big biomolecules. IMS instruments are extremely sensitive stand-alone devices, but are often coupled with mass spectrometry (MS), gas chromatography or high-performance liquid chromatography (HPLC) in order to achieve a multi-dimensional separation. They come in various sizes, ranging from a few millimetres to several metres depending on the specific application, and are capable of operating under a broad range of conditions. IMS instruments such as microscale high-field asymmetric-waveform ion mobility spectrometry can be palm-portable for use in a range of applications including volatile organic compound (VOC) monitoring, biological sample analysis, medical diagnosis and food quality monitoring. Systems operated at higher pressure (i.e. atmospheric conditions, 1 atm or 1013 hPa) are often accompanied by elevated temperature (above 100 °C), while lower pressure systems (1–20 hPa) do not require heating.

== History ==
IMS was first developed primarily by Earl W. McDaniel of Georgia Institute of Technology in the 1950s and 1960s when he used drift cells with low applied electric fields to study gas phase ion mobilities and reactions. In the following decades, he integrated the recently developed technology he had been working on with a magnetic-sector mass spectrometer. During this period, others also utilized his techniques in novel and original ways. Since then, IMS cells have been included in various configurations of mass spectrometers, gas chromatographs, and high-performance liquid chromatography instruments. IMS is a method used in multiple contexts, and the breadth of applications that it can support, in addition to its capabilities, is continually being expanded.

== Applications ==
Perhaps ion mobility spectrometry's greatest strength is the speed at which separations occur—typically on the order of tens of milliseconds. This feature combined with its ease of use, relatively high sensitivity, and highly compact design have allowed IMS as a commercial product to be used as a routine tool for the field detection of explosives, drugs, and chemical weapons. Major manufacturers of IMS screening devices used in airports are Morpho and Smiths Detection. Smiths purchased Morpho Detection in 2017 and subsequently had to legally divest ownership of the Trace side of the business (Smiths have Trace Products) which was sold on to Rapiscan Systems in mid 2017. The products are listed under ETD Itemisers. The latest model is a non-radiation 4DX.

In the pharmaceutical industry, IMS is used in cleaning validations, demonstrating that reaction vessels are sufficiently clean to proceed with the next batch of pharmaceutical product. IMS is much faster and more accurate than HPLC and total organic carbon methods previously used. IMS is also used for analyzing the composition of drugs produced, thereby finding a place in quality assurance and control.

As a research tool, ion mobility is becoming a more widely used technique for the analysis of biological materials, specifically proteomics, metabolomics and glycomics. For example, in proteomics IMS-MS using matrix-assisted laser desorption/ionization (MALDI) as the ionization method has helped by providing faster high-resolution separations of protein pieces in analysis. An important piece information gained by ion mobility are the collision cross sections (CCS). These rotationally averaged 2D-projections of the molecule, providing an insight in the global shape. In proteomics, these can be used to gain insights in the stability of protein and multi-protein complexes via collision induced dissociation (CID) experiments. While in metabolomics and glycomics, the CCS can, when coupled to mass spectrometry (MS), be used to separate isomers of the same compound. This way, adding CCS values of glycans and their fragments to databases will increase structural identification confidence and accuracy. In addition to the empirical determination, CCS values can be computationally calculated if the 3D-structure of the molecule is known. Current CCS algorithms allow ms calculation times, making them very powerful when combined with AlphaFold and/or molecular dynamic simulations. Since IMS can separate protonated isomers, it has been employed for monitoring intramolecular proton transfer in small molecules.

Outside of laboratory purposes, IMS has found great usage as a detection tool for hazardous substances. More than 10,000 IMS devices are in use worldwide in airports, and the US Army has more than 50,000 IMS devices. In industrial settings, uses of IMS include checking equipment cleanliness and detecting emission contents, such as determining the amount of hydrochloric and hydrofluoric acid in a stack gas from a process. It is also applied in industrial purposes to detect harmful substances in air.

In metabolomics, the IMS is used to detect lung cancer, chronic obstructive pulmonary disease, sarcoidosis, potential rejections after lung transplantation and relations to bacteria within the lung (see breath gas analysis).

== Ion mobility ==
The physical quantity ion mobility K is defined as the proportionality factor between an ion's drift velocity v_{d} in a gas and an electric field of strength E:
$$v_\text{d} = KE.$$

After making the necessary adjustments to account for the n_{0} standard gas density, ion mobilities are often expressed as reduced mobilities. This number can also be described as standard temperature T_{0} = 273 K and standard pressure p_{0} = 1013 hPa. Both of these can be found in the table below. Ion concentrations are another term that may be used when referring to ion mobilities. Because of this, the decreased ion mobility is still temperature-dependent, although this adjustment does not consider any impacts other than the reduction in gas density.
$$K_0 = K \frac{n}{n_0} = K \frac{T_0}{T} \frac{p}{p_0}.$$

The ion mobility K can, under a variety of assumptions, be calculated by the Mason–Schamp equation
$$K = \frac{3}{16} \sqrt{\frac{2\pi}{\mu kT}} \frac{Q}{n\sigma},$$
where Q is the ion charge, n is the drift gas number density, μ is the reduced mass of the ion and the drift gas molecules, k is Boltzmann constant, T is the drift gas temperature, and σ is the collision cross-section between the ion and the drift gas molecules. Often, N is used instead of n for the drift gas number density, and Ω instead σ for the ion–neutral collision cross-section. This relation holds approximately at a low electric field limit, where the ratio of E/N is small, and thus the thermal energy of the ions is much greater than the energy gained from the electric field between collisions. With these ions having similar energies as the buffer gas molecules, diffusion forces dominate ion motion in this case. The ratio E/N is typically given in townsends (Td), and the transition between low- and high-field conditions is typically estimated to occur between 2 and 10 Td. When low-field conditions no longer prevail, the ion mobility itself becomes a function of the electric field strength, which is usually described empirically through the so-called alpha function:
$$K\left(\frac{E}{N}\right) =
K(0) \left[1 + \alpha\left(\frac{E}{N}\right)\right] =
K(0) \left[1 + \alpha_2\left[\frac{E}{N}\right]^2 + \alpha_4\left[\frac{E}{N}\right]^4 + \dots\right].$$

== Ionization ==
The molecules of the sample need to be ionized, usually by corona discharge, atmospheric pressure photoionization (APPI), electrospray ionization (ESI), or radioactive atmospheric-pressure chemical ionization (R-APCI) source, e.g. a small piece of ^{63}Ni or ^{241}Am, similar to the one used in ionization smoke detectors. ESI and MALDI techniques are commonly used when IMS is paired with mass spectrometry.

Doping materials are sometimes added to the ionization region for ionization selectivity. For example, acetone can be added for chemical warfare agent detection, chlorinated solvents added for explosives, and nicotinamide added for drugs detection.

== Analyzers ==
Ion mobility spectrometers exist based on various principles, optimized for different applications. A review from 2014 lists eight different ion mobility spectrometry concepts.

=== Drift tube ion mobility spectrometry ===
Drift tube ion mobility spectrometry (DTIMS) measures how long a given ion takes to traverse a given length in a uniform electric field through a given atmosphere. In specified intervals, a sample of the ions is let into the drift region; the gating mechanism is based on a charged electrode working in a similar way as the control grid in triodes works for electrons. For precise control of the ion pulse width admitted to the drift tube, more complex gating systems such as a Bradbury–Nielsen or a field switching shutter are employed. Once in the drift tube, ions are subjected to a homogeneous electric field ranging from a few volts per centimetre up to many hundreds of volts per centimetre. This electric field then drives the ions through the drift tube where they interact with the neutral drift molecules contained within the system and separate based on the ion mobility, arriving at the detector for measurement. Ions are recorded at the detector in order from the fastest to the slowest, generating a response signal characteristic for the chemical composition of the measured sample.

The ion mobility K can then be experimentally determined from the drift time t_{D} of an ion traversing within a homogeneous electric field the potential difference U in the drift length L.

$$K = \frac{L^2}{t_\text{D} U}$$

A drift tube's resolving power R_{P} can, when diffusion is assumed as the sole contributor to peak broadening, be calculated as

$$R_\text{P}= \frac{t_\text{D}}{\Delta t_\text{D}}= \sqrt{\frac{LEQ}{16kT\ln2}}$$

where t_{D} is the ion drift time, Δt_{D} is the full width at half maximum, L is the tube length, E is the electric field strength, Q is the ion charge, k is the Boltzmann constant, and T is the drift gas temperature. Ambient pressure methods allow for higher resolving power and greater separation selectivity due to a higher rate of ion-molecule interactions and is typically used for stand-alone devices, as well as for detectors for gas, liquid, and supercriticial fluid chromatography. As shown above, the resolving power depends on the total voltage drop the ion traverses. Using a drift voltage of 25 kV in a 15 cm long atmospheric pressure drift tube, a resolving power above 250 is achievable even for small, single charged ions. This is sufficient to achieve separation of some isotopologues based on their difference in reduced mass μ.

=== Low pressure drift tube ===
Reduced pressure drift tubes operate using the same principles as their atmospheric pressure counterparts, but at drift gas pressure of only a few torr. Due to the vastly reduced number of ion-neutral interactions, much longer drift tubes or much faster ion shutters are necessary to achieve the same resolving power. However, the reduced pressure operation offers several advantages. First, it eases interfacing the IMS with mass spectrometry. Second, at lower pressures, ions can be stored for injection from an ion trap and re-focussed radially during and after the separation. Third, high values of E/N can be achieved, allowing for direct measurement of K(E/N) over a wide range.

=== Travelling wave ===
Though drift electric fields are normally uniform, non-uniform drift fields can also be used. One example is the travelling wave IMS, which is a low pressure drift tube IMS where the electric field is only applied in a small region of the drift tube. This region then moves along the drift tube, creating a wave pushing the ions towards the detector, removing the need for a high total drift voltage. A direct determination of collision cross sections (CCS) is not possible, using TWIMS. Calibrants can help circumvent this major drawback, however, these should be matched for size, charge and chemical class of the given analyte. An especially noteworthy variant is the "SUPER" IMS, which combines ion trapping by the so-called structures for lossless ion manipulations (SLIM) with several passes through the same drift region to achieve extremely high resolving powers.

=== Trapped ion mobility spectrometry ===
In trapped ion mobility spectrometry (TIMS), ions are held stationary (or trapped) in a flowing buffer gas by an axial electric field gradient (EFG) profile while the application of radio frequency (rf) potentials results in trapping in the radial dimension. TIMS operates in the pressure range of 2 to 5 hPa and replaces the ion funnel found in the source region of modern mass spectrometers. It can be coupled with nearly any mass analyzer through either the standard mode of operation for beam-type instruments or selective accumulation mode (SA-TIMS) when used with trapping mass spectrometry (MS) instruments.

Effectively, the drift cell is prolonged by the ion motion created through the gas flow. Thus, TIMS devices do neither require large size nor high voltage in order to achieve high resolution, for instance achieving over 250 resolving power from a 4.7 cm device through the use of extended separation times. However, the resolving power strongly depends on the ion mobility and decreases for more mobile ions. In addition, TIMS can be capable of higher sensitivity than other ion mobility systems because no grids or shutters exist in the ion path, improving ion transmission both during ion mobility experiments and while operating in a transparent MS only mode.

=== High-field asymmetric waveform ion mobility spectrometry ===
DMS (differential mobility spectrometer) or FAIMS (field asymmetric ion mobility spectrometer) make use of the dependence of the ion mobility K on the electric field strength E at high electric fields. Ions are transported through the device by the drift gas flow and subjected to different field strengths in orthogonal direction for different amounts of time. Ions are deflected towards the walls of the analyzer based on the change of their mobility. Thereby only ions with a certain mobility dependence can pass the thus created filter

=== Differential mobility analyzer ===
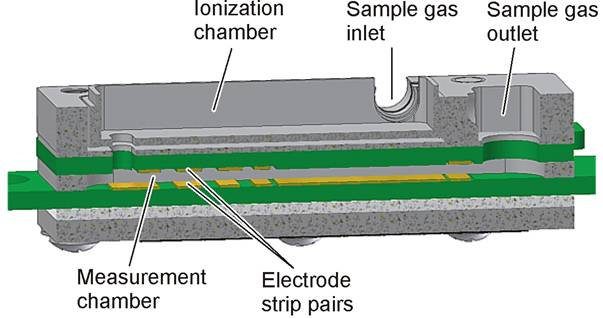
Example of Aspiration IMS sensor.

A differential mobility analyzer (DMA) makes use of a fast gas stream perpendicular to the electric field. Thereby ions of different mobilities undergo different trajectories. This type of IMS corresponds to the sector instruments in mass spectrometry. They also work as a scannable filter. Examples include the differential mobility detector first commercialized by Varian in the CP-4900 MicroGC. Aspiration IMS operates with open-loop circulation of sampled air. Sample flow is passed via ionization chamber and then enters to measurement area where the ions are deflected into one or more measuring electrodes by perpendicular electric field which can be either static or varying. The output of the sensor is characteristic of the ion mobility distribution and can be used for detection and identification purposes.

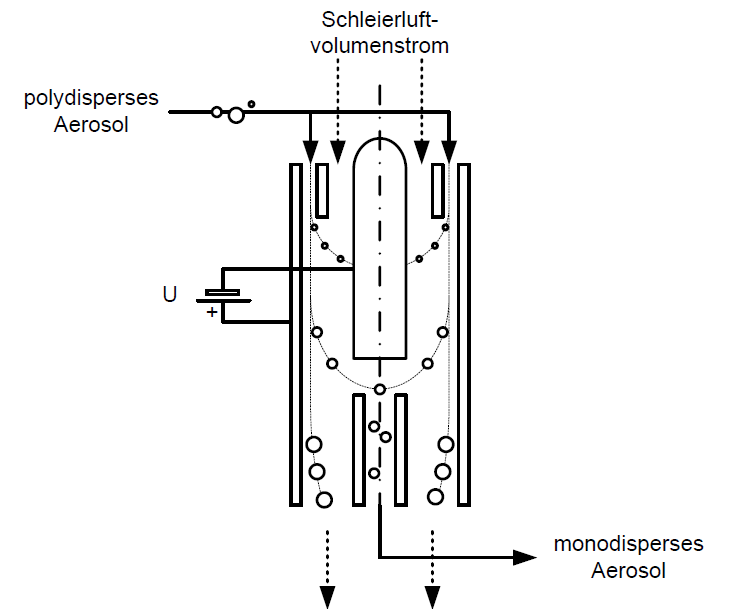
Principle of operation of a differential mobility analyzer for aerosol separation

A DMA can separate charged aerosol particles or ions according to their mobility in an electric field prior to their detection, which can be done with several means, including electrometers or the more sophisticated mass spectrometers.

== Drift gas ==
The drift gas composition is an important parameter for the IMS instrument design and resolution. Often, different drift gas compositions can allow for the separation of otherwise overlapping peaks. Elevated gas temperature assists in removing ion clusters that may distort experimental measurements.

== Detector ==
Often the detector is a simple Faraday plate coupled to a transimpedance amplifier, however, more advanced ion mobility instruments are coupled with mass spectrometers in order to obtain both size and mass information simultaneously. It is noteworthy that the detector influences the optimum operating conditions for the ion mobility experiment.

== Combined methods ==
IMS can be combined with other separation techniques.

=== Gas chromatography ===
When IMS is coupled with gas chromatography, common sample introduction is with the GC capillary column directly connected to the IMS setup, with molecules ionized as they elute from GC. A similar technique is commonly used for HPLC. A novel design for corona discharge ionization ion mobility spectrometry (CD–IMS) as a detector after capillary gas chromatography has been produced in 2012. In this design, a hollow needle was used for corona discharge creation and the effluent was entered into the ionization region on the upstream side of the corona source. In addition to the practical conveniences in coupling the capillary to IMS cell, this direct axial interfacing helps us to achieve a more efficient ionization, resulting in higher sensitivity.

When used with GC, a differential mobility analyzer is often called a differential mobility detector (DMD). A DMD is often a type of microelectromechanical system, radio frequency modulated ion mobility spectrometry (MEMS RF-IMS) device. Though small, it can fit into portable units, such as transferable gas chromatographs or drug/explosives sensors. For instance, it was incorporated by Varian in its CP-4900 DMD MicroGC, and by Thermo Fisher in its EGIS Defender system, designed to detect narcotics and explosives in transportation or other security applications.

=== Liquid chromatography ===
Coupled with LC and MS, IMS has become widely used to analyze biomolecules, a practice heavily developed by David E. Clemmer, now at Indiana University (Bloomington).

=== Mass spectrometry ===
When IMS is used with mass spectrometry, ion mobility spectrometry-mass spectrometry offers many advantages, including better signal to noise, isomer separation, and charge state identification. IMS has commonly been attached to several mass spec analyzers, including quadrupole, time-of-flight, and Fourier transform cyclotron resonance.

== Dedicated software ==
Ion mobility mass spectrometry is a rather recently popularized gas phase ion analysis technique. As such there is not a large software offering to display and analyze ion mobility mass spectrometric data, apart from the software packages that are shipped along with the instruments. ProteoWizard, OpenMS, and msXpertSuite are free software according to the OpenSourceInitiative definition. While ProteoWizard and OpenMS have features to allow spectrum scrutiny, those software packages do not provide combination features. In contrast, msXpertSuite features the ability to combine spectra according to various criteria: retention time, m/z range, drift time range, for example. msXpertSuite thus more closely mimics the software that usually comes bundled with the mass spectrometer.

== See also ==
- Electrical mobility
- Explosive detection
- Viehland–Mason theory

== Bibliography ==
- G.A. Eiceman; Z. Karpas (2005). Ion Mobility Spectrometry (2nd ed.). Boca Raton, FL., USA: CRC Press. ISBN 9780849322471.
- Alexandre A. Shvartsburg (2008). Differential Ion Mobility Spectrometry: Nonlinear Ion Transport and Fundamentals of FAIMS (2nd ed.). Boca Raton, FL., USA: CRC Press. ISBN 9781420051063.
- Charles L. Wilkins; Sarah Trimpin, eds. (2010). Ion Mobility Spectrometry - Mass Spectrometry: Theory and Applications. Boca Raton, FL., USA: CRC Press. ISBN 9781439813249.
- Stach, Joachim; Baumbach, Jörg I. (2002). "Ion Mobility Spectrometry – Basic Elements and Applications". International Journal for Ion Mobility Spectrometry. 5 (1): 1–21.
