= UC Berkeley College of Chemistry =

University college

University of California, Berkeley College of Chemistry
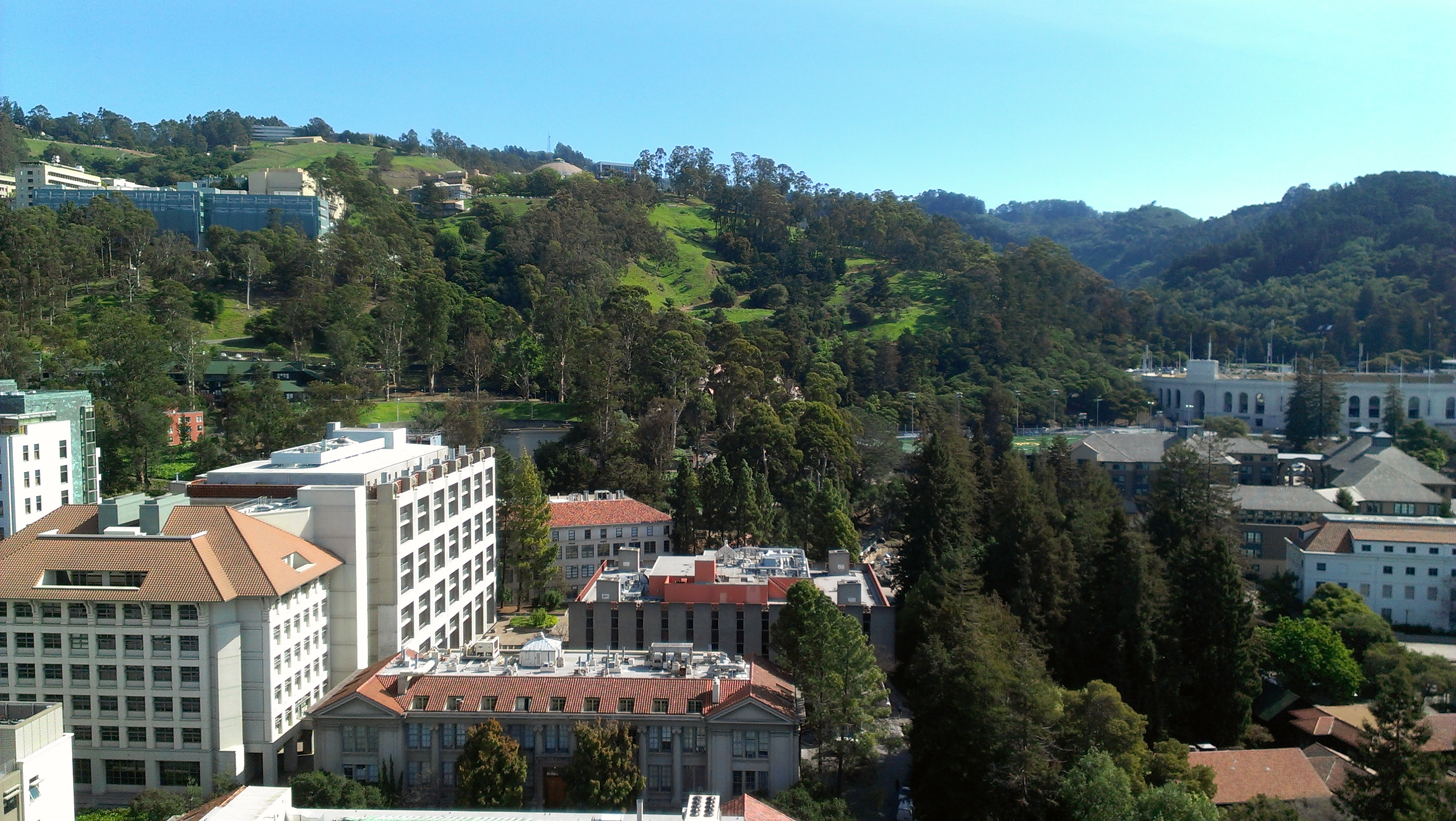
- Established: March 12, 1872; 154 years ago
- Dean: Anne Baranger
- Faculty: 96
- Undergraduates: 963 (2020-21)
- Postgraduates: 539; 123 postdoctoral (2020-21)
- Location: Berkeley, California, U.S. 37°52′22.16″N 122°15′22.04″W
- Website: chemistry.berkeley.edu

The UC Berkeley College of Chemistry is one of the fifteen schools and colleges at the University of California, Berkeley. It houses the department of chemistry and the department of chemical and biomolecular engineering.

The College offers bachelor of science degrees in chemistry, chemical engineering, and chemical biology. Chemistry undergraduates have the option to earn a bachelor of arts degree in chemistry from the College of Letters and Science or to specialize in a materials chemistry concentration. With the College of Engineering, the College of Chemistry offers two joint majors: chemical engineering/materials science & engineering and chemical engineering/nuclear engineering. Its graduate programs confer M.S. and Ph.D. degrees in chemical engineering, a Ph.D. in chemistry, and three professional master's degrees.

== History ==
Although Berkeley began offering chemistry courses in 1869, the College was not officially established until 1872, awarding its first Ph.D. in 1885 to John Maxson Stillman, who later founded the chemistry department at Stanford University. A division of chemical engineering was formed in 1946, becoming a department in 1957. The department of chemical engineering changed its name to chemical and biomolecular engineering in 2010 to reflect the widening research interests of its faculty.

Faculty and researchers at the College and affiliated with Lawrence Berkeley National Laboratory are responsible for the discovery of sixteen elements, including berkelium, californium, and seaborgium, named after Nobel laureate, department chair, and alumnus Glenn Seaborg.

== Students and faculty ==
Today, the College comprises one of the largest chemistry programs in the nation, with a faculty of 96 professors, researchers, and lecturers and an enrollment of 963 undergraduate, 539 postgraduate, and 123 postdoctoral students. In the spring of 2021, the College conferred 187 bachelor's degrees and 93 graduate degrees. The faculty includes a Nobel laureate, twelve members of the National Academy of Engineering; 37 members of the National Academy of Sciences; and 34 members of the American Academy of Arts and Sciences. The College has thirty endowed chairs and professorships.

== Campus ==
The College occupies a complex of six buildings on the northeastern corner of the Berkeley campus. Completed in 1917, Gilman Hall, where plutonium was identified in 1941, is the oldest of the buildings. Pimentel Hall, one of the largest lecture halls on campus, features a revolving stage that can accommodate chemistry demonstrations. The buildings are linked by a network of underground hallways and laboratories. The newest building, Tan Hall, was dedicated in 1997. A new building, Healthcock Hall, is scheduled to break ground in 2023-24.

== Notable faculty ==
- Paul Alivisatos (Ph.D. 1986) - Professor Emeritus, National Medal of Science (2015); Priestley Medal (2020)
- Neil Bartlett - Professor (1969)
- Carolyn Bertozzi (Ph.D. 1993) - Professor (1996-2015), Nobel Prize (2022)
- Melvin Calvin (B.S. 1931, Ph.D. 1935) - Professor, Nobel laureate (1961)
- Robert E. Connick (Ph.D. 1942) - Professor Emeritus of Chemistry, Dean
- Jennifer Doudna - Professor, Wolf Award (2020), Nobel laureate (2020)
- William F. Giauque (B.S. 1920, Ph.D. 1922) - Professor, Nobel laureate (1949)
- John F. Hartwig - Professor, Wolf Award (2019)
- Martin Head-Gordon (B.S. 1983, Ph.D. 1989) - Professor (1992), Medal of the International Academy of Quantum Molecular Sciences (1998)
- Dudley R. Herschbach - Assistant Professor, Nobel laureate (1986)
- Joel Henry Hildebrand (Ph.D. 1906) - Dean (1949–1951), Chairman of the Dept. of Chemistry (1941–1943), Professor
- Darleane Hoffman - Professor, National Medal of Science (1997)
- Judith Klinman - Professor, National Medal of Science (2012)
- Yuan T. Lee (Ph.D. 1965) - Professor, Nobel laureate (1986)
- Gilbert Newton Lewis - Dean (1912–1941), Professor
- Willard F. Libby (B.S. 1931, Ph.D. 1933) - Professor (1933-1941), Nobel laureate (1960)
- Jeffrey R. Long - Professor, National Science Foundation Special Creativity Award
- David MacMillan - Professor (1998-2000), Nobel Prize (2021)
- George C. Pimentel (Ph.D. 1949) - Professor (1949-1989), National Medal of Science (1985)
- Kenneth Pitzer (Ph.D. 1937) - Dean (1951–60), Professor, President of Rice University and Stanford University
- John Prausnitz - Professor, National Medal of Science (2003)
- Glenn T. Seaborg (Ph.D. 1937) - Professor, Nobel laureate (1951)
- Gabor Somorjai - Professor, National Medal of Science (2002)
- Andrew Streitwieser - Professor, National Academy of Science
- Peidong Yang - Professor, MacArthur Genius Award (2015)
- Omar Yaghi - Professor, Wolf Award (2018)

== Notable alumni ==
- Jan Anderson (Ph.D. 1959 Chemistry) - investigation of photosynthesis
- Frances Arnold (Ph.D. 1985 Chemical Engineering) - Nobel laureate (2018)
- Thomas Cech (Ph.D. 1975 Chemistry) - Nobel laureate (1989)
- Robert F. Curl, Jr. (Ph.D. 1957 Chemistry) - Nobel laureate (1996)
- Henry Eyring - (Ph.D. 1927 Chemistry) - National Medal of Science (1966)
- Andrew Grove (Ph.D. 1963 Chemical Engineering) - cofounder of Intel
- Richard A. Houghten (Ph.D. 1975 Chemistry) - Florida Inventors Hall of Fame (2018)
- Willis Lamb (B.S. 1934 Chemistry) - Nobel laureate in Physics (1955)
- Gordon Moore (B.S. 1950 Chemistry) - cofounder of Intel
- Mario Molina (Ph.D. 1972 Chemistry) - Nobel laureate (1995)
- Kary Mullis (Ph.D. 1972 Biochemistry) - Nobel laureate (1993)
- Geraldine Richmond (Ph.D. 1980 Chemistry) - Priestley Medal (2018)
- Susan Solomon (Ph.D. 1981 Atmospheric Chemistry) - Nobel Peace Prize (2007), National Medal of Science (1999)
- Henry Taube (Ph.D. 1940 Chemistry) - Nobel laureate (1983)
- Harold C. Urey (Ph.D. 1923 Chemistry) - Nobel laureate (1934)
- A.R. Frank Wazzan (B.S. 1959 Chemical Engineering) - Dean, UCLA School of Engineering and Applied Sciences 1986 - 2001.
- Ahmed Zewail (Postdoc. 1974 Chemistry) - Nobel laureate (1999)

== Centers and institutes ==
- Berkeley Catalysis Center
- Berkeley Center for Green Chemistry
- Berkeley Global Science Institute
- Berkeley Nanosciences and Nanoengineering Institute
- Berkeley Nanotechnology Club
- Berkeley Quantum Information and Computation Center
- Berkeley Stem Cell Center
- California Research Alliance
- CalSolv Center
- Center for Computational Biology
- Center for Genetically Encoded Materials
- Center for Information Technology Research in the Interest of Society (CITRIS)
- California Institute for Quantitative Biosciences (QB3)
- Energy Biosciences Institute (EBI)
- Energy Frontier Research Center on Gas Separations
- Joint BioEnergy Institute
- Joint Center for Artificial Photosynthesis
- Pitzer Center for Theoretical Chemistry
- Synthetic Biology Engineering Research Center
