= Michel Baranger =

Franco-American theoretical physicist (1927–2014)

Michel Jacques Louis Baranger (31 July 1927, Le Mans – 1 October 2014, Tucson, Arizona) was a Franco-American theoretical physicist.

Baranger matriculated in 1945 at the École normale supérieure, Paris, graduating there in 1949. In 1951 he received from Cornell University his PhD under Hans Bethe with dissertation Relativistic Corrections to the Lamb shift. (Bethe, L. M. Brown, and John R. Stehn had previously calculated a non-relavistic estimate of the Lamb shift.) At Cornell University and then at Caltech from 1953 to 1955, he was also an assistant to Richard Feynman. In 1955 Baranger joined the physics department of Carnegie Institute of Technology, where he became an assistant professor in 1956 and a full professor in 1964. In 1969 he became a professor at MIT, where he retired as professor emeritus in 1997. After retirement from MIT, he worked at the New England Complex Systems Institute and was an adjunct professor at the University of Arizona, Tucson.

In 1961/62 he was Senior Fellow of the National Science Foundation at the Sorbonne.

His research in the late fifties and sixties in plasma spectroscopy and nuclear collective motion had particular impact. More recently, Baranger had worked in the areas of semi-classical quantum chaos and speciation as a complex system.

He was a US citizen. He was elected a Fellow of the American Physical Society in 1968.

Upon his death he was survived by two sons, a daughter, four grandchildren, and three former wives: Elizabeth Baranger (born 1927, a physicist and eldest child of Harold Urey), Anne Gerard and Mary Lee Baranger.
