= Rudolph Schoenheimer =

German-American biochemist (1898–1941)

Rudolf Schoenheimer
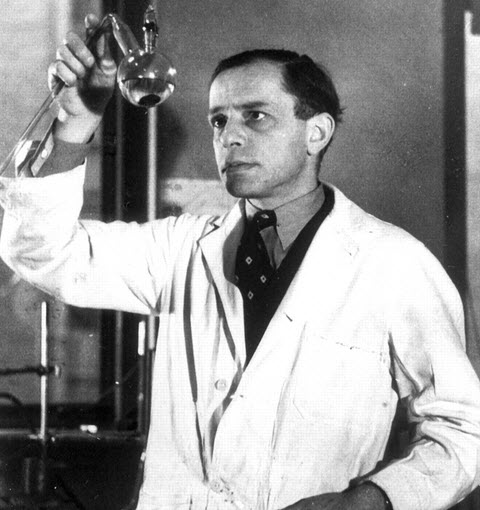
- Born: May 10, 1898; Berlin, Germany
- Died: September 11, 1941 (aged 43); Yonkers, New York, U.S
- Education: Friedrich Wilhelm University
- Known for: isotope tagging of biomolecules
- Scientific career
- Fields: biochemistry
- Workplaces: Columbia University

Rudolf Schoenheimer (May 10, 1898 – September 11, 1941) was a German-American biochemist who developed the technique of isotope labelling of biomolecules, enabling detailed study of metabolism. This work revealed that all the constituents of an organism are in a constant state of chemical renewal.

Born in Berlin, after graduating in medicine from the Friedrich Wilhelm University there, he learned further organic chemistry at the University of Leipzig and then studied biochemistry at the University of Freiburg where he rose to be Head of Physiological Chemistry.

He spent the 1930-31 academic year at the University of Chicago.

In 1933, following the rise of the Nazis to power he emigrated from Germany to the Columbia University to join the department of Biological Chemistry. Working with David Rittenberg, from the radiochemistry laboratory of Harold C. Urey and later together with Konrad Bloch, they used stable isotopes to tag foodstuffs and trace their metabolism within living things.

He further established that cholesterol is a risk factor in atherosclerosis.

He suffered from manic depression all of his life, which led to him in 1941 committing suicide using sodium cyanide. He had been honoured with the request to give the Dunham Lecture at Harvard before his death. It was read for him following his death.

== Early life and education ==
Rudolf Schoenheimer was born in Berlin, Germany on 10 May 1898. He was the son of Gertrude Edel and Hugo Schoenheimer, who was a physician. He was Jewish, however his family converted to Christianity. He attended local schools in Berlin before graduating from the Dorotheen-Stadtische Gymnasium in 1916. Following his graduation Schoenheimer was drafted into the German army. He served in the artillery on the western front for two years during world war 1. Following his service in the war, he began his study of medicine at the University of Berlin. In 1922 he received his M.D. His M.D dissertation was titled "Über die experimentelle Cholesterinkrankheit der Kaninchen" ("About the experimental cholesterol disease of rabbits"). He then spent a year working at the Moabit Hospital in Berlin as a pathologist. He continued his scientific research during this time and studied the production of atherosclerosis in animals through administering cholesterol.

In 1924, Schoenheimer began his 3-year study at the University of Leipzig, in a program aimed at advancing his knowledge in chemistry. The program was aided by the Rockefeller Foundation and taught by Karl Thomas, professor of physiological chemistry at the University of Leipzig. During his time at Leipzig, Schoenheimer was able to develop a method of synthesising peptides.

== Career ==
After his studies at Leipzig had ended, he began a year of work at the Moabit Hospital in Berlin as the resident pathologist. During this time, he began his research and studies on the issue of atherosclerosis. His first published works, dated during this period were in on the development of atherosclerosis in experimental animals when administered cholesterol. He also spent time working in the laboratory of Peter Rona at the Berlin Municipal Hospital.

In 1926, Schoenheimer was invited by Ludwig Aschoff to join the faculty at the University of Freiburg. There he worked as an assistant professor. The investigation of pathological material was part of his work duties. During this time, he also researched atherosclerosis and the role of dietary cholesterol in its development. He became the active in 1927, and then the titular, head of his division in 1931.

In 1930, until 1931, Schoenheimer was in the United States as the Douglas Smith Fellow at the University of Chicago. During this time Schoenheimer came into contact with the Josiah Macy Jr Foundation. Later in 1931, The Macy Foundation, with Ludwig Kast as its president, started supporting Schoenheimer in his atherosclerosis studies. Following his fellowship, he returned to the University of Freiburg, taking the position of head of the Pathological Chemistry department.

=== Columbia University: 1933-1934 ===
In April 1933, Schoenheimer emigrated to the United States in response to the Nazi regime's policy for the dismissal of Jewish faculty in universities. He was offered work at Columbia University as an assistant professor, where he continued his research on metabolism and cholesterol synthesis, alongside Walter M. Sperry and David Rittenberg.

In 1933, Germany entered a political crisis and saw the rise of Hitler and the Nazi Party, which led Schoenheimer into emigrating to the United States. Schoenheimer had Jewish heritage which he was conscious of despite his Family having converted to Christianity. Schoenheimer had joined a Jewish Youth Movement and was actively involved in the Zionist Organisation following WW1. Due to the situation in Germany at the time and the Nazi Policy dismissing Jewish faculty, Schoenheimer was unlikely to remain living in Germany. Ludwig Kast was informed of this situation and contacted U.S universities, Cornell and Columbia on behalf of Schoenheimer. Hans T. Clarke, the Chairman of the Biological Chemistry Department at the University of Columbia, invited Schoenheimer to work at the university. He began work in the Department of Biological Chemistry as a research assistant. The Josiah Macy Foundation provided his salary and research support whilst he worked at Columbia. At Columbia Schoenheimer was among others that shared similar interests in Biochemistry and wanted it to move in the direction of organic chemistry.

== Scientific work ==
Schoenheimer's scientific work contributed to biochemistry and metabolic studies, with his most significant work being the application of isotopes to the study of intermediary metabolism. Schoenheimer's earlier scientific work in the 1920s centered on the physiology and pathology of sterols.

=== Early work: 1924-1933 ===
In 1926, while at the University of Leipzig, Schoenheimer developed a method of synthesising peptides. From 1903 to 1909, Emil Fischer's scientific work had prompted the synthesis of many peptides, however there were limitations to his method. Fischer used a halogen acyl amino acid halide coupling method. A suitable method was needed, which involved an amino blocking group being removed by a nonhydrolyptic process. This method was first proposed by Rudolph Schoenheimer, as he utilised earlier findings by Michel Bergmann which demonstrated that with a mixture of hydrogen iodide and phosphonium iodide, p-toluenesulfonyl amino acids could be detosylated reductively. Schoenheimer used the azide coupling method introduced by Theodor Curtius, and the acid chloride method introduced by Emil Fischer in order to make several peptides.

In 1929, Schoenheimer investigated how different sterols impacted cholesterol deposition in rabbits. It had been assumed that only plants were able to synthesize complex compounds whilst animals were forced to obtain these compounds indirectly from plants. It was assumed also that there would only small chemical changes were necessary when modifying these compounds to suit specific needs. Previous cholesterol-balance studies indicated that under specific conditions, animals could possess the ability to form cholesterol, as it has been discovered that sometimes negative balances are present in metabolic studies, wherein more sterol is excreted than consumed. These observations did not demonstrate whether cholesterol present in the animal body was due to synthesis or whether it had all actually come from vegetable food. The transformation of plant sterols into cholesterol within the body of an animal requires the sterol to be absorbable. This is the notion Schoenheimer investigated in his experiments. One of his experiments involved administering two different diets to a group of rabbits. Rabbits are sensitive to a diet which includes cholesterol, and their bodily responses particularly that of the aorta demonstrates a change that similarly resembles the Human atherosclerosis. In the experiment one diet involved a large amount of sito-sterol, which is a type of plant sterol. The other diet included cholesterol. The observations of the experiment indicated that Schoenheimer and his associates' theories that plant sterols were not absorbable were probable. Furthur studies were conducted and the findings concluded that plant sterols were non-absorbable, and therefore animals with plant only diets must synthesise the cholesterol necessary for their tissues as they do not receive absorbable cholesterol. During this period Schoenheimer became aware that cholesterol had an intermediary metabolism and that it was chemically inconvertable with other sterols. In one of his later experiments using sterols, he did discover a small percentage of one sterol, dihydrocholesterol in animal tissue. He investigated this finding using a dog which showed dihydrocholesterol was formed in the tissues. This finding revealed to Schoenheimer that cholesterol was an active metabolite. Schoenheimer and his associates also investigated ergo-sterol, and its behaviour within the bodies of rats, mice, and rabbits. The findings of this study revealed that egro-sterol was not absorbable. This research shaped Schoenheimer's scientific career and research path.

=== Later work: 1933-1941 ===
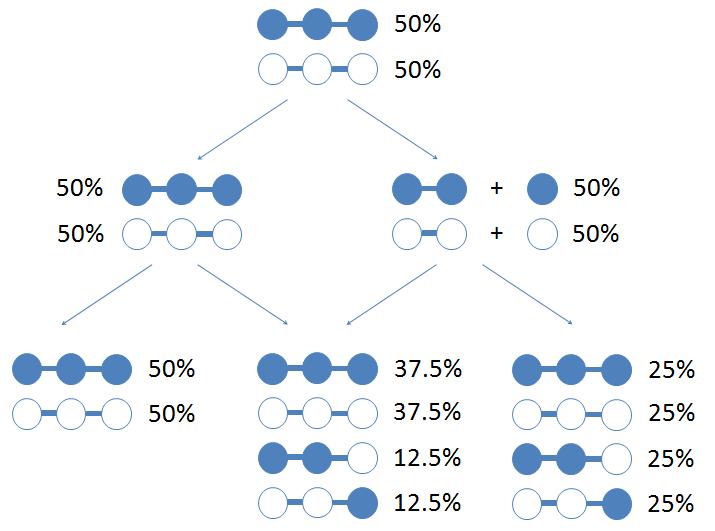
Stable Isotope Labeling

In 1933, Schoenheimer emigrated to the United States, where his scientific research took a different focus. Prior to his emigration, his work was mostly focused on the metabolism of cholesterol. In 1934 Schoenheimer began his work on intermediary metabolism, and how stable isotopes could be applied to the study. Schoenheimer worked alongside David Rittenburg and later Konrad Bloch. Schoenheimer and his colleagues began their research by conducting experiments with the use of deuterium. Deuterium, which is a stable isotope of hydrogen, was discovered by physical chemist Harold Urey in 1932. One of the methods used in the experiment involved heavy water administered into animals in order to analyse the deuterium present in the different constituents of the body. This suggested which type of substances were utilising the hydrogen present in body fluids and revealed the role water posed in metabolic processes. Their experiment also provided information regarding the breakdown process of lipid compounds containing deuterium in experimental animals. Prior to this study, it was assumed that animals utilised fats directly from foods that they had recently ingested, and that fat stores were only used amid starvation. The experiment revealed that fatty acids remained stored in body depots even during starvation.

Schoenheimer and his colleagues then began a study of protein metabolism using the isotope of nitrogen as it became available. Schoenheimer and his colleague David Rittenberg, analysed how synthesised amino acids containing nitrogen would operate within an animal's body. They used adult rats as the subject of their experiment and added amino acids synthesised from isotopic ammonia to their diet. When these diets were applied in nitrogen equilibrium it was found they were incorporated into tissue proteins at an intensive and rapid rate. There was also evidence of chemical transformation as heavy nitrogen was present in amino acids, which were isolated from protein, following ingestion. This chemical transformation was similar to that demonstrated in the fatty acids of his previous experiments on intermediary metabolism. The results of the experiment revealed that body proteins are in a continuous and dynamic state of synthesis and degradation. Schoenheimer and Rittenberg were responsible for discovering that body constituents were in a state of constant chemical renewal, as they were previously believed to be in a static state. Experiments on the metabolism of amino acids, fatty acids, and excretory products are used to support and demonstrate this concept of metabolic "regeneration". These molecules go through a process of replacement and interchange in the body tissue, as well as other transformations and fundamental chemical reactions. This method of isotope labelling molecules enabled Schoenheimer and his colleagues to investigate various issues in intermediary metabolism.

By the late 1930s, Schoenheimer's work had contributed to the rising interest in intermediary metabolism and the isotope method.

== Later life and death ==
Schoenheimer had married Salome Glucksohn, a noted zoologist and geneticist, in 1937. They emigrated to the United States together, and they had no children. They later divorced. Schoenheimer was invited to conduct lectures detailing his scientific work and findings. In 1937, he conducted his Harvey Lecture and in 1941 his Dunham Lecture was conducted by his colleagues in his behalf. At the height of his career he committed suicide by ingesting potassium cyanide at his home in Yonkers, having struggled with depression for multiple years.

== Use of Schoenheimer's scientific findings ==
Schoenheimer's scientific work and his development of isotope tagging techniques enabled biochemists to discover the various metabolic pathways of the body.

Schoenheimer was among the first scientists to identify that the bodies of humans and animals had processes of renewal and regeneration. The methods and techniques used by Schoenheimer also provided a means to measure quantities of substances within the body prior to the advent of the technologies and software for dynamic modeling.

Schoenheimer's 1933 metabolic balance study in animals presented early evidence of "end-product feedback inhibition of cholesterol synthesis". In later years, with greater advancements in science and technology, including the advent of radioactive isotopes, greater information on cholesterol feedback was discovered.

== Bibliography ==
- Brown, M.S, Engelking, L.J, Evers, B, Goldstein, J.L, Hammer, R.E, Horton, J.D, Kuriyama, H, Liang, G, Li, W.P, & Liang, G 2005, 'Schoenheimer effect explained - Feedback regulation of cholesterol synthesis in mice mediated by Insig proteins', The Journal of clinical investigation, vol. 115, pp. 2489–98
- Clarke, Hans T (12 December 1941). "Rudolf Schoenheimer, 1898-1941". Science, New Series. 94: 553–554.
- Cooper, D.Y, & Osborn, M.E 1999, 'Schoenheimer, Rudolph', American National Biography Helmenstine, A.M 2019, 'Deuterium Facts', https://www.thoughtco.com/facts-about-deuterium-607910
- Engelking, L. J. (2005-08-25). "Schoenheimer effect explained - feedback regulation of cholesterol synthesis in mice mediated by Insig proteins". Journal of Clinical Investigation. 115 (9): 2489–2498. doi:10.1172/jci25614 ISSN 0021-9738.
- Fruton, Joseph S. (January 1982). "The carbobenzoxy method of peptide synthesis". Trends in Biochemical Sciences. 7 (1): 37–39. doi:10.1016/0968-0004(82)90064-0 ISSN 0968-0004.
- Hargrove, James L. (1998). Dynamic modeling in the health sciences. Springer. pp. ix. ISBN 0-387-94996-8. OCLC 876222114
- Helmenstine, A.M (2019). "Deuterium Facts".
- Kohler R, Jr 1977, 'Rudolph Schoenheimer, Isotopic Tracers, and Biochemistry in the 1930s', Historical Studies in the Physical Sciences, vol. 8, pp. 257–298
- Medawar, Jean: Pyke, David (2012). Hitler's Gift: The True Story of the Scientists Expelled by the Nazi Regime (Paperback). New York: Arcade Publishing. ISBN 978-1-61145-709-4.
- Quastel J.H. 1942, 'Obituary: Prof. Rudolf Schoenheimer' Nature. 1942; 149, pp. 15–16
- Schoenheimer, R 1931, 'New Contributions in Sterol Metabolism', Science, New Series, vol. 74, no. 1928, pp. 579–584
- Schoenheimer, R 1942, 'The Dynamic State Of Body Constituents' Cancer Research, vol. 2, no. 11, p. 810.
- Simoni, R.D, Hill, R.L, & Vaughan, M 2002, 'The Use of Isotope Tracers to Study Intermediary Metabolism: Rudolph Schoenheimer', The Journal of Biological Chemistry, vol. 277, No. 43
- 'Schoenheimer, Rudolf'Complete Dictionary of Scientific Biography, Encyclopedia.com. 23 Apr. 2020 https://www.encyclopedia.com
