= Sabine Flitsch =

German organic chemist and glycoscientist

Sabine Flitsch is a German organic chemist and chemical biologist who holds a personal chair in Chemical Biology at the University of Manchester School of Chemistry, where she runs an active research glycobiology research group based in the Manchester Interdisciplinary Biocentre.

== Early life and education ==
Flitsch was born in Münster, North Rhine-Westphalia, Germany, and was educated at the University of Münster, where she obtained a first-class degree and diploma in chemistry. She subsequently received a Michael Wills Scholarship to pursue doctoral studies at the University of Oxford. Her D.Phil. research, supervised by Sir Jack Edward Baldwin, focused on the enzymatic synthesis of new penicillins and was completed in 1985.

She is the daughter of the noted organic chemist Professor Wilhelm Flitsch. Her sister, Mareile Flitsch, is a sinologist, professor, and director of the Ethnographic Museum of the University of Zurich. All three members of the Flitsch family are alumni of the University of Münster, from which she received her diploma in 1982.

== Career and research highlights ==
Following her PhD, Flitsch took up a DAAD Postdoctoral Fellowship at the Massachusetts Institute of Technology, where she worked with Professor Har Gobind Khorana. In 1988, she returned to the University of Oxford and took up a lectureship in Organic Chemistry, which she held for the next 6 years. She joined the University of Edinburgh in 1995, and was an independent BBSRC Career Research Development Fellow between 2001 and 2004. In October 2004, Flitsch was awarded a personal Chair in Chemical Biology at the University of Manchester in the Department of Chemistry. Based at The Manchester Institute of Biotechnology, she is currently one of three professors of chemical biology. Additionally, Professor Flitsch is an elected member of the Royal Society of Chemistry Council of the United Kingdom and a director of the spin-out company Bio-Shape ltd. Flitsch is also currently the Scientific Director of IBCarb and CarboMet networks and is a director of the biotechnology spin-out company Bio-Shape Ltd. Flitsch’s research is focussed on glycobiotechnology – the study of carbohydrates in applied science and biocatalysis – the application of enzymes in sustainable chemical manufacture. She is particularly recognised for her work at the interface of these two fields (glycoenzymology). Her research career spans over 35 years and has included many examples of pioneering work. Current research interests include the chemical analysis and biological exploitation of carbohydrates, and the creation of tools and resource ‘toolboxes’ for furthering research and innovation in basic and applied glycoscience. During her postdoctoral research at MIT, Flitsch was involved in mutagenic studies of bacterial membrane proteins to help study protein folding in micelle membrane-like models. She was also instrumental in the development of cysteine mutant technology for biorthogonal labelling of proteins. She has also expanded this work to encompass modifications for spin labelling, and the study of glycoproteins and their analysis on gold plates and nanoparticles. These approaches were complemented by the use of enzymatic modifications of polysaccharides and glycoproteins to facilitate analysis, for which Prof. Flitsch’s research group has engineered tailored biocatalysts via directed evolution, and to address the biological challenge of 'sequencing' carbohydrates through chemical and conformational means. Detailed studies of enzyme reactions have also provided new insights into the effect of interfaces on enzyme catalysis and allowed new methods for surface chemistry and synthesis of biomolecules Flitsch's use of recombinant enzymes extends into the field of sustainable chemical manufacture, encompassing the discovery, development and demonstration of a range of biocatalysts for production of fine chemical and pharmaceutical building blocks. Recently Prof. Flitsch has been at the forefront of biocatalytic research, constructing enzyme cascades and artificial synthetic pathways to allow multistep syntheses under common reaction conditions. and new approaches to high-resolution glycan analysis using ion mobility mass spectrometry

== Research Networks, Scientific Education and Training, Scientific Outreach ==
Through her interdisciplinary research group, Sabine has supported the research training of over 100 staff and students. Her mentorship and guidance has allowed many of these to advance into principal investigators at a variety of institutions worldwide. Sabine has been an active in the promotion of science and research to policy makers and the wider community. As part of a successful bid to present at the Summer Science Exhibition 2013 hosted by the Royal Society in London, Flitsch’s research was showcased along with collaborators from across the UK, through a series of hands-on activities and demonstrations. The initiative, called “The Complex Life of Sugars”, has become a permanent feature of the Programme of Public Engagement with Research and Researchers at the Manchester Institute of Biotechnology. As part of this it has been showcased at numerous national outreach events (Great British Bioscience Festival 2014, Royal Society Satellite Exhibition 2016, New Scientist Live! 2016) as well as locally as part of initiatives to reach non-traditional outreach audiences (ScienceX at the Trafford Centre). She has also represented the local authority as a governor of a secondary school within Greater Manchester. As director of the IBCarb Network in Industrial Biotechnology and Bioenergy, Flitsch was able to drive forward the strategy for academic and industrial collaboration in the UK, following on from a whitepaper “Roadmap for Glycoscience in Europe”, which she co-authored. The work of this network has been replicated by an EU Coordination and Support Action (CarboMet) also directed by Prof. Fltisch. Additionally, she was part of a Scientist-MEP pairing scheme to aid links between research and scientific policy. She has also acted as an external examiner at a number of UK universities, including St. Andrews, Imperial College London, Liverpool, Hull and Leicester.

== Awards and honours ==
Flitsch has been nominated for and awarded prizes including the Zeneca Research Award (1996), the Glaxo Wellcome Award for Innovative Chemistry (1997) and is the recipient of a Royal Society Wolfson Merit Award (2007–2012) and a Royal Society of Chemistry Interdisciplinary Award (2014).

In 2025, Flitsch was awarded the prestigious Emil Fischer Prize, alongside Prof. M. Carmen Galan of the University of Bristol, UK, marking the first time the prize was awarded to two recipients. Flitsch was honoured for her pioneering research in glycoscience, particularly at the intersection of glycobiology and enzymology, as well as her significant contributions to developing new approaches for high-resolution glycan analysis using mass spectrometry.
