= Eyers =

Eyers is a surname. Notable people with this surname include:

- Claire E. Eyers (born 20th century), British professor
- Harry Eyers (1908–1976), Australian rugby league footballer
- Jack Eyers (born 1989), British paracanoeist
- Patrick Eyers (1933–2023), British diplomat

== See also ==
- Eyers Grove, Pennsylvania, a census-designated place
