= Department of Biochemistry, Cell and Systems Biology, University of Liverpool =

Research-intensive centre of excellence at the University of Liverpool

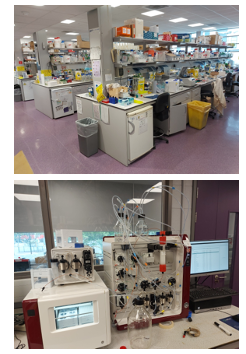
Biochemistry multi-purpose research laboratories, where protein purification, biophysics and proteomics are major themes.

The Department of Biochemistry, Cell and Systems Biology, sometimes abbreviated to BCSB, the department is a research-intensive centre of excellence at the University of Liverpool with significant international expertise in cellular proteomics, metabolomics, systems biology, cell signaling, bioinformatics and structural biology (including protein structure prediction and alphafold applications) that is based in refurbished laboratories and research facilities located in the Bioscience and Nuffield buildings of the Knowledge Centre/Quarter North Campus.

With a continuous history of research-led discovery and teaching, BCSB contributes significantly to undergraduate and postgraduate teaching and training and is part of the Institute of Systems, Molecular and Integrative Biology, which was created in 2020 and represents a key research-intensive hub within the broader Faculty of Health and Life Sciences, holding > £300 million in its grant funding portfolios as of 2025. The 125th Anniversary of the founding of the department will be celebrated in 2027.

== Oldest biochemistry department in the world ==
The current department is directly descended from the original Biochemistry Department, the world's first and oldest, which was created in 1902 at the University of Liverpool through a philanthropic donation. The early years of Liverpool biochemistry (1902–1971) are discussed in depth in official archives and the 100th anniversary was officially celebrated in 2002. The original Biochemistry building in the university quadrangle remains the site of occasional 'pilgrimages' from other long-established Biochemistry Departments such as those affiliated with the University of Toronto and the Indian Institute of Science in Bengaluru, whose Department of Biochemistry was created in 1921 and remains an official partner, as part of the University of Liverpool campus in Bengaluru, India announced in 2025

== A new home for biochemistry in Liverpool ==
The world's first Biochemistry Department (originally employing the archaic term 'Bio-chemistry') opened its research doors in 1903 within the newly created Johnston Laboratories, forming an early biomedical hub with other buildings that homed the Nobel Prize winning neurophysiologist Sir Charles Sherrington, who coined the term synapse. The original buildings are still in use today by the university, although not for laboratory-based research. The public-health scientist and visionary Benjamin Moore, was the inaugural holder of the world's first chair in Biochemistry, named The Johnston Chair in honour of the local benefactor William Johnston, a prominent Liverpool businessman.

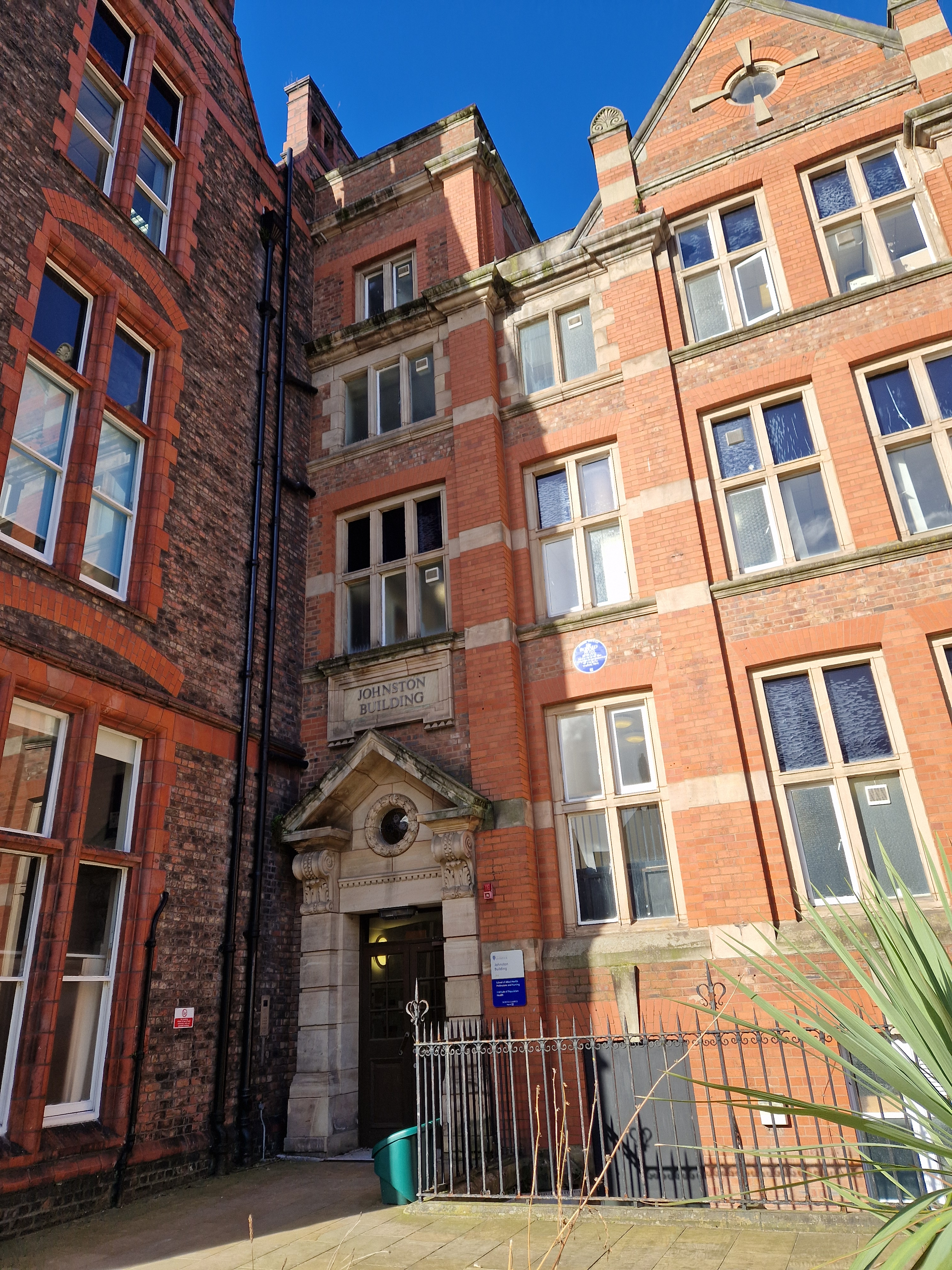
The Johnston Laboratories, University Quadrangle, Liverpool. View from 2025. Note the blue plaque to Sir Charles Sherrington

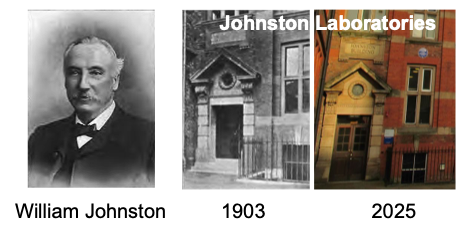
William Johnston and the laboratories he created. Same views from 1903 and 2025.

Moore and another Liverpool biochemist, Edward Whitney, founded the Biochemical Journal in 1906, one year after the creation of the US-based Journal of Biological Chemistry in 1905. Both journals still exist. Moore served as the first Biochemical Journal editor with the journal initially being published by the Liverpool University Press, the 3rd oldest University Press in England. Moore was concerned with the high mortality for the United Kingdom of pulmonary tuberculosis (TB), which he called the ‘Great White Plague', concluding that with 'the foundation of a new National Health Service and the provision of segregation for infectious cases in sanatoria, the disease could be eradicated'. Other holders of the Johnston Chair include RA Morton, FRS HH Rees, the late Trevour Goodwin FRS and the current Head of Department PA Eyers

The Liverpool-originated Biochemical Journal was acquired by the London-based Biochemical Club (later renamed the Biochemical Society in 1911.

== Research, teaching and training ==
As of 2025, the Department of Biochemistry, Cell and Systems Biology is composed of 46 tenured and tenure-track research-focused teaching academics, studying the Departmental research themes of cell biology, systems and computational biology, cell signaling, multiomics, photosynthesis and plants and mechanistic structural biology. The department is home to a broad selection of Early Career Researchers and senior Professorial staff including Sonia Rocha, a specialist in Hypoxia-inducible factor, Dan Rigden, noted for his work with CASP Douglas Kell, a leader in systems and synthetic biology, Claire Eyers, a proteomics and biological mass spectrometry expert, Luning Liu, Ben Goult, J Bernadette Moore, Richard Scheltema, Sylvie Urbe and Roy Goodacre, editor of the peer-reviewed journal Metabolomics (journal).

The department possesses dedicated research, mentoring and technical professional support staff, all of whom were recognised through the award of a Gold Athena Swan Award in 2025, one of only a handful of Institutes in the UK to achieve this distinction,. Grant-funded research from across the UKRI, Wellcome, industrial and charity portfolios is performed in state-of-the-art facilities where biochemical approaches sit alongside cutting-edge multiomics technology to study the chemistry of life.

From the analysis of individual atoms within proteins to the genetic and protein-based reconstruction of complex biological systems, the department provides various vital links between basic and translational biomedical research, contributing heavily to the C700 Biochemistry and C130 Biomedical Sciences undergraduate degree programmes and MSc taught courses in Bioinformatics and Biotechnology.
