= Anne Baranger =

American chemist

Anne Michelle Baranger
- Education: University of California, Berkeley (PhD); Massachusetts Institute of Technology
- Relatives: Harold Urey (grandfather); Elizabeth Baranger (mother)
- Scientific career
- Workplaces: Yale University; University of California, Berkeley
- Thesis: Catalytic and stoichiometric reactivity of Zirconocene and bridging zirconocene-iridium imido complexes (1993)

Anne Michelle Baranger is an American chemist who is professor of chemistry at the University of California, Berkeley. She is the interim dean for the College of Chemistry. Her research considers the experiences of chemistry students and ways to increase the number of students studying STEM subjects.

== Education ==
Baranger was an undergraduate student at the Massachusetts Institute of Technology, where she majored in chemistry. She moved to the University of California, Berkeley for graduate studies, where she completed a doctorate in inorganic chemistry, working under the supervision of Robert Bergman.

== Career ==
Baranger joined the faculty at the Wesleyan University in 1996. She spent 10 years at Wesleyan, before moving to the University of Illinois Urbana-Champaign in 2006. At UIUC, Baranger was affiliated with the Biochemistry Department (in the School of Molecular and Cellular Biology, MCB) and the Center for Biophysics and Computational Biology, to continue research work focused on "understanding, controlling, and modifying processes involving RNA", and she was made associate head of the Department of Chemistry. Baranger was appointed as a UIUC Chancellors Fellow in 2010, to begin work on that university's I-STEM Education Initiative, where the aim was to "develop a method for the evaluation of STEM departments" (with Chemistry being the prototype department), and to establish a STEM task force campus-wide "to establish a better flow of information and collaboration between... STEM units" at that university.

Baranger moved to University of California, Berkeley in 2011, to become Director of Undergraduate Chemistry. In 2020 she became the Berkeley College of Chemistry's first associate dean for diversity, equity, and inclusion. In 2025 she became the interim dean for the College of Chemistry. She is the first woman to serve in this role.

=== Chemistry education research ===
In addition to the early research on the biochemistry and biophysics of RNA, Baranger's research moved in the direction of chemical education, where it has addressed chemistry education and the development of evidence-based educational practices, including examining representation in science, technology, engineering, and mathematics fields, the experience of chemistry majors, integration of green chemistry in laboratory instruction, and strategies to improve the chemistry education in general. She has also examined the concept of sense of belonging in chemistry departments.

== Awards and honors ==
- 2002 Alfred P. Sloan Research Fellowship
- 2015 American Chemical Society Committee on Environmental Improvement Award
- 2016 Alfred P. Sloan Foundation Foundation Fellowship

== Selected publications ==
- Marcia C Linn; Erin Palmer; Anne Baranger; Elizabeth Gerard; Elisa Stone (February 1, 2015). "Education. Undergraduate research experiences: impacts and opportunities". Science. 347 (6222) 1261757. doi:10.1126/SCIENCE.1261757. ISSN 0036-8075. PMID 25657254.
- Stachl, Christiane N.; Baranger, Anne M. (May 21, 2020). "Sense of belonging within the graduate community of a research-focused STEM department: Quantitative assessment using a visual narrative and item response theory". PLOS ONE. 15 (5) e0233431. Bibcode:2020PLoSO..1533431S. doi:10.1371/journal.pone.0233431. ISSN 1932-6203. PMC 7241794. PMID 32437417.
- Walsh, P. J.; Baranger, A. M.; Bergman, R. G. (August 21, 2010). "ChemInform Abstract: Stoichiometric and Catalytic Hydroamination of Alkynes and Allene by Zirconium Bisamides Cp2Zr(NHR)2". ChemInform. 23 (26): no. doi:10.1002/chin.199226089. ISSN 0931-7597.
