= Ion-mobility spectrometry–mass spectrometry =

Analytical chemistry method

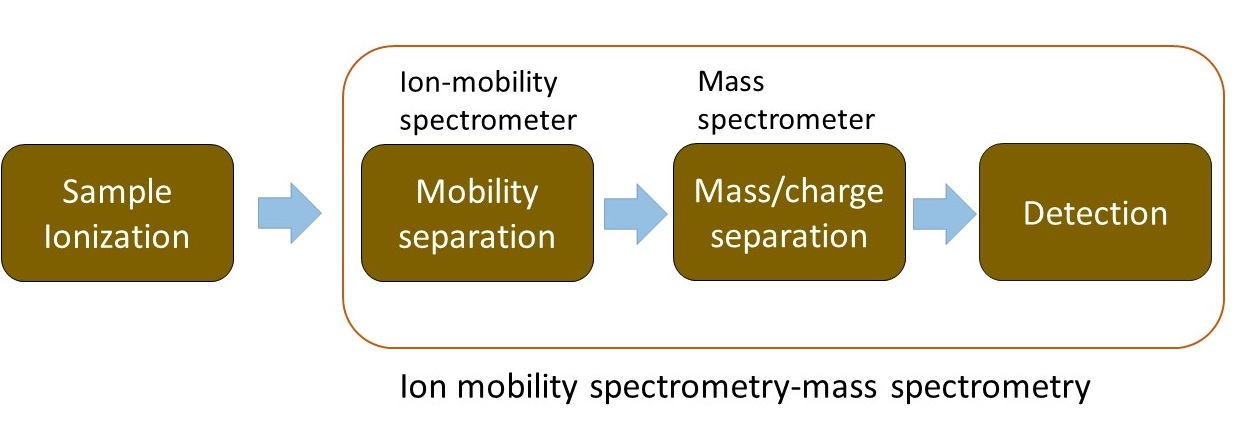
Ion mobility spectrometry-mass spectrometry (IM-MS) workflow

Ion mobility spectrometry–mass spectrometry (IMS-MS) is an analytical chemistry method that separates gas phase ions based on their interaction with a collision gas and their masses. In the first step, the ions are separated according to their mobility through a buffer gas on a millisecond timescale using an ion mobility spectrometer. The separated ions are then introduced into a mass analyzer in a second step where their mass-to-charge ratios can be determined on a microsecond timescale. The effective separation of analytes achieved with this method makes it widely applicable in the analysis of complex samples such as in proteomics and metabolomics.

== History ==
Earl W. McDaniel has been called the father of ion mobility mass spectrometry. In the early 1960s, he coupled a low-field ion mobility drift cell to a sector mass spectrometer.

The combination of time-of-flight mass spectrometry and ion mobility spectrometry was pioneered in 1963 at Bell Labs. In 1963 McAfee and Edelson published an IMS-TOF combination. In 1967 McKnight, McAfee and Sipler published an IMS-TOF combination. Their instrument included an orthogonal TOF. In 1969 Cohen et al. filed a patent on an IMS-QMS system. The QMS at that time was an improvement compared to the TOFMS, because the TOFMS had a slow electronic data acquisition systems at that time. In 1970, Young, Edelson and Falconer published an IMS-TOF with orthogonal extraction. They seem to have used the same system as McKnight et al. in 1967, incorporating slight modifications. Their work was later reproduced in the landmark book of Mason/McDaniel, which is regarded as the "bible of IMS" by those skilled in the art.

In 1996 Guevremont et al. presented a poster at the ASMS conference about IMS-TOF. In 1997 Tanner patented a quadrupole with axial fields which can be used as a drift cell for IMS separation. He also mentions the combination of these quadrupoles with an orthogonal TOFMS. In 1998 Clemmer developed an IMS-TOF combination, using a co-axial IMS-TOF setup. In 1999 Clemmer developed an IMS-TOF with an orthogonal TOF system. This work led to the development of an ion mobility-quadrupole-CID-TOFMS instrument by Micromass in the UK and ultimately led Micromass / Waters corporation to develop of the world's first commercial ion mobility-mass spectrometer instrument in 2006. The Synapt, as it is called, incorporates a pre ion mobility quadrupole allowing precursor ion selection prior to IMS separation further enhancing the flexibility of the ion mobility-mass spectrometry combinations. In 2013, Agilent Technologies released the first commercial drift tube ion mobility-mass spectrometer named 6560 with an 80 cm drift tube. Ion funnels are used to improve the ion transmission efficiency. The design thus greatly improved the sensitivity of ion mobility and allowed commercialization.

A variation of IMS-MS is differential ion mobility spectrometry-mass spectrometry (DIMS-MS), in which gas phase ions are separated based on their ion mobility in varying strengths of electric fields. This analytical method is currently being advanced by Gary Glish and the Glish Group.

== Instrumentation ==
The IMS-MS is a combination of an ion mobility spectrometer and a mass spectrometer, as discussed by Professor Claire E. Eyers and colleagues in a recent review.

A drift-time ion mobility spectrometer. In IM-MS, the detector is typically a time-of-flight mass spectrometer.

=== Sample introduction and ionization ===
The first stage of the instrument is an ion source where samples are converted to gas phase ions. Many ionization methods similar to those traditionally used for mass spectrometry have been employed for IM-MS depending on the physical state of the analyte. Gas phase samples are typically ionized with radioactive ionization, corona discharge ionization and photoionization techniques. Electrospray ionization is a common method for ionizing samples in solution. Solid-phase analytes are ionized with matrix-assisted laser desorption ionization (MALDI) for large mass molecules or laser desorption ionization (LDI) for molecules with smaller masses.

=== Ion mobility separation ===
There are different types of ion mobility spectrometers and there are different types of mass spectrometers. In principle it is possible to combine every type of the former with any type of the latter. However, in the real world, different types of ion mobility are coupled with different types of mass spectrometers to achieve reasonable sensitivity. The main types of ion mobility spectrometers that have been coupled to a mass spectrometer for IM-MS applications are discussed below.

==== Drift tube ion mobility spectrometry (DTIMS) ====
In DTIMS, ions are drifted through a tube whose length could vary from 5 cm to 300 cm using as electric field gradient. Smaller ions travel faster through the drift tube than ions with larger collision cross section. Thus, ions are separated based on their drift time through the tube. Drift tube ion mobility does not employ RF voltage which may heat ions, and it can preserve the structure of the ions. The rotationally averaged collision cross section (CCS) which is a physical property of ions reflecting the shape of the ions can be measured accurately on drift tube ion mobility. The resolving power is high (CCS resolution can be higher than 100). Drift tube ion mobility is widely used for structure analysis. It is usually coupled with time-of-flight (TOF) mass spectrometer.

==== Differential mobility spectrometry (DMS) ====
Also known as field asymmetric-waveform ion mobility spectrometry (FAIMS) or RF-DC ion mobility spectrometry is a technique in which ions are separated by the application of a high-voltage asymmetric waveform at radio frequency (RF) combined with a static (DC) waveform applied between two electrodes. Depending on the ratio of the high-field and low-field mobility of the ion, it will migrate toward one or the other electrode. Only ions with specific mobility will pass through the device. It is well known that the high RF field distort the conformation of the ions, FAIMS thus is a separation technique without preserving the structure of the ions and the CCSs of the ions cannot be measured. Because FAIMS is a mass selector (other ions are excluded), the sensitivity in the scan mode is much lower than that of the drift tube ion mobility (all the ions are analyzed). Therefore, FAIMS is usually coupled with triple quadrupole mass spectrometer which is also ion selection type instrument.

==== Travelling wave ion mobility spectrometry (TWIMS) ====
In TWIMS, ions are separated according to their mobility through a travelling wave in a gas filled cell. Both radio-frequency (RF) and direct current (DC) voltages are applied to a series of ring electrodes called a stacked ring ion guide (SRIG) to confine the ions and create a travelling wave. Based on the speed and magnitude of the travelling wave, ions can be separated. Smaller ions have higher mobility through the wave due to fewer collisions with gas molecules and exit the cell faster than ions of lower mobility (larger ions). Similar to DTIMS, CCS values of ions can be calculated with TWIMS using a calibration derived with known standards. A commercial example of the TWIMS-MS instrumentation is Waters Corp Synapt G2-S instrument.

=== Mass separation ===
The traditional IM-MS instrument uses a time‐of‐flight (TOF) mass spectrometer interfaced to an IMS. The TOF-MS has many advantages including the high speed of data acquisition and good sensitivity. Since mass spectral data is acquired on a microsecond time scale, multiple mass spectra are collected for each IMS spectrum (acquired on millisecond timescale). The quadrupole mass spectrometer has also been coupled to an IMS, although at a slower scan rate. Other mass spectrometers including the ion trap, Fourier transform ion cyclotron resonance (FT-ICR), or magnetic sector mass spectrometers have also been coupled with different IMS for various applications. Additionally, hybrid mass spectrometers have been interfaced to more than one ion mobility cell for tandem or IMS^{n}–MS^{m} applications.

== Applications ==
The IM-MS technique can be used for analyzing complex mixtures based on differing mobilities in an electric field. The gas phase ion structure can be studied using IM-MS through measurement of the CCS and comparison with CCS of standard samples or CCS calculated from molecular modelling. The signal-to-noise ratio is obviously improved because the noise can be physically separated with signal in IM-MS. In addition, isomers can be separated if their shapes are different. The peak capacity of IM-MS is much larger than MS so more compounds can be found and analyzed. This character is very critical for -omics study which requires analyzing as many compounds as possible in a single run. It has been used in the detection of chemical warfare agents, detection of explosives, in proteomics for the analysis of proteins, peptides, drug-like molecules and nano particles. Moreover, IM-MS can be used to monitor isomeric reaction intermediates and probe their kinetics. Recently, microscale FAIMS has been integrated with electrospray ionization MS and liquid chromatography MS to rapidly separate ions in milliseconds prior to mass analysis. The use of microscale FAIMS in electrospray ionization MS and liquid chromatography MS can significantly improve peak capacity and signal-to-noise for a range of applications including proteomics, and pharmaceutical analysis.

Recently, gas phase ion activation methods have been used to gain new insights into complex structures. Collision induced unfolding (CIU) is a technique in which an ion's internal energy is increased through collisions with a buffer gas prior to IM-MS analysis. Unfolding of the ion is observed through larger CCSs, and the energy at which unfolding occurs corresponds partially to noncovalent interactions within the ion. This technique has been used to differentiate polyubiquitin linkages and intact antibodies.

== See also ==
- Liquid chromatography-mass spectrometry
- Gas chromatography-mass spectrometry

== Bibliography ==
- Wilkins CL, Trimpin S (16 December 2010). Ion Mobility Spectrometry - Mass Spectrometry: Theory and Applications. Taylor & Francis US. ISBN 978-1-4398-1324-9.
