= Elizabeth Baranger =

American physicist and academic administrator (1927–2019)

- Born: Gertrude Bessie Urey; September 18, 1927; Baltimore, Maryland, U.S.
- Died: May 30, 2019 (aged 91)
- Education: Swarthmore College; Cornell University (PhD)
- Spouse: Michel Baranger (m. 1951–1973)
- Children: 3, including Anne Baranger
- Father: Harold Urey
- Scientific career
- Fields: Nuclear physics
- Workplaces: University of Pittsburgh
- Doctoral advisor: Hans Bethe

Elizabeth Urey Baranger (née Gertrude Bessie Urey; September 18, 1927 – May 30, 2019) was an American physicist and academic administrator at the University of Pittsburgh. Her research concerned shell model calculations in nuclear physics.

== Early life and education ==
Gertrude Bessie Urey was born on September 18, 1927, in Baltimore, but grew up in Leonia, New Jersey. As the daughter of physical chemist Harold Urey she met many other physicists from the Manhattan Project as a child, including Maria Mayer, who won the Nobel Prize for proposing the shell model of nuclear physics. She was the 1945 valedictorian of Leonia High School, and studied mathematics at Swarthmore College, graduating in 1949.

She earned a PhD in physics at Cornell University in 1954. Her PhD was supervised by Nobel Laureate Hans Bethe. While completing her dissertation, she married fellow physicist Michel Baranger, on September 26, 1951, and spent two years as a visiting researcher at the California Institute of Technology.

== Career and later life ==
In 1955, Baranger and her husband solved their two-body problem by taking faculty positions at the University of Pittsburgh and Carnegie Institute of Technology (later Carnegie Mellon University), respectively. At Pittsburgh, she was the second female physics faculty member after Mary Wargo; she moved through the academic ranks from her initial position as an instructor to full professor.

When her husband moved to the Massachusetts Institute of Technology in 1969, she followed him there, giving up her faculty position to become a senior research scientist. They divorced in 1973, and she returned to the University of Pittsburgh, becoming dean for graduate studies in the Faculty of Arts and Sciences. In 1989, she became vice provost for graduate studies. Her work as an academic administrator involved "upgrading the standards of the university's graduate programs and promoting the use of the Internet in graduate administration".

She retired in 2004, and died on May 30, 2019.

== Recognition ==
Baranger was named a Fellow of the American Physical Society (APS) in 1972, after a nomination from the APS Division of Nuclear Physics. She was also named as a fellow of the American Association for the Advancement of Science in 1985.

The University of Pittsburgh has two awards named for Baranger, the Elizabeth Baranger Excellence in Teaching Award and the Elizabeth U. Baranger Pre-Doctoral Fellowship.

== Family ==
Beyond her family connections to academic physics through her father Harold Urey and former husband Michel Baranger, two of Baranger's three children also became academic scientists: Anne M. Baranger, professor of chemistry and Associate Dean for Diversity, Equity, and Inclusion at the University of California, Berkeley, and Harold U. Baranger, professor of physics at Duke University.
