= Salome Gluecksohn-Waelsch =

German-born US developmental geneticist (1907-2007)

- Born: Salome Gluecksohn; October 6, 1907; Danzig, Germany
- Died: November 7, 2007 (aged 100); New York City
- Education: University of Freiburg
- Known for: Tracing the effects of the muant Brachyury gene of the mouse to the notochord
- Spouses: Rudolph Schoenheimer (died 1941), Heinrich Waelsch (married 1943)
- Children: Two
- Awards: Thomas Hunt Morgan Medal
- Scientific career
- Fields: Developmental genetics
- Workplaces: University of Freiburg, Columbia University, Albert Einstein College of Medicine

Salome Gluecksohn-Waelsch (October 6, 1907 – November 7, 2007) was a German-born U.S. geneticist and co-founder of the field of developmental genetics, which investigates the genetic mechanisms of development.

== Biography ==
Gluecksohn-Waelsch was born in Danzig, Germany to Jewish parents, Nadia and Ilya Gluecksohn. She grew up in Germany between World War I and II, where her family faced hardships including her father's death in the 1918 influenza epidemic, severe post-war inflation, and intense antisemitic sentiment.

She studied chemistry and zoology in Königsberg and Berlin before she joined Spemann's laboratory at the University of Freiburg in 1928. She commented on both Spemann's nationalist tendencies and prejudice against women scientists; prejudices she faced as a Jewish woman limited her career options in Germany. Salome started to quietly disagree with Spemann as he and his peers believed adamantly that there was no overlap in genetics and embryonic development. However, it would have not been wise to go against her professor at that time so she kept quiet until later on in her professional career.

In 1932, she received her doctorate from the University of Freiburg for her work on the embryological limb development of aquatic salamanders. In the same year she married the biochemist Rudolph Schönheimer, with whom she escaped from Nazi Germany in 1933. She went on to become a lecturer at Columbia University in 1936, bringing embryological acumen to Leslie C. Dunn's genetics laboratory, where she remained for 17 years. Gluecksohn-Waelsch attempted to find mutations that affected early development and discover the processes that these genes affected. In 1938, she acquired US citizenship, and after Schönheimer's death in 1941 she married the neurochemist Heinrich Waelsch in 1943, with whom she had two children.

Columbia University's policies would not allow her a faculty position, even after many productive years of research. She left Columbia University in 1953 to commence a professorship in anatomy at the newly founded Albert Einstein College of Medicine (AECOM), where she became a full professor in 1958 and held the chair of molecular genetics from 1963 to 1976. She received emeritus status in 1978, but continued researching actively for many more years, publishing and participating in scientific conferences until the 1990s.

She died at age 100 in New York City.

== Scientific career ==
Gluecksohn-Waelsch's scientific career started when L.C. Dunn hired her to his project involving breeding mice with a 'T locus' mutation. She presented her work showing that the T-locus product acted as an inducer of mesoderm and axial development. Gluecksohn-Waelsch worked on the genetics of differentiation, the process by which unspecified cells from a fertilized egg adopt their various specific fates in development. As Gluecksohn-Waelsch combined the embryological expertise she had acquired at Spemann's lab with methods of classical mouse genetics, she is considered the founder of mammalian developmental genetics. She co-authored over 100 publications on developmental genetics. Her research showed that mutations in the Brachyury gene of the mouse caused the aberrant development of the posterior portion of the embryo and she traced the effects of this mutant gene to the notochord, which normally patterns the dorsal-ventral axis.

From 1968-83, she collaborated with Carl Ferdinand Cori, winner of the 1947 Nobel Prize in Physiology or Medicine.

== Awards and honors ==
Gluecksohn-Waelsch's scientific work was honored late in life. In 1979, she became a member of the National Academy of Sciences. She was elected a Fellow of the American Academy of Arts and Sciences in 1980. In 1982 the University of Freiburg presented her with the "Goldene Promotion", and in 1993 American president Bill Clinton presented her with the National Medal of Science. She became an overseas member of the Royal Society in 1995 and was awarded the Thomas Hunt Morgan Medal for "a lifetime contribution to the science of genetics" in 1999.

In 2010, the Freiburg-based Spemann Graduate School of Biology and Medicine (SGBM) and the AECOM Department of Genetics introduced the Salome Gluecksohn-Waelsch Prize for the best dissertation.

== See also ==
- Hilde Mangold
- Conrad Waddington

== Further research ==
- Hyman, P.E./Moore, D.D., eds. 1998. Jewish Women in America: An Historical Encyclopedia. New York: Routledge.
- Gilbert, S.F., 2006. Developmental Biology. Massachusetts: Sinauer.
- Scott F. Gilbert, Biography of Salome Gluecksohn-Waelsch, Jewish Women Encyclopedia
- Life, work and photo
- Citation for honorary DSc from Columbia University
- On The Shoulders of Giants: John Wheeler and Salome Waelsch obituary podcast transcript from Scientific American website
- Tietjen, Jill S.; Busch-Vishniac, Ilene; Busch, Lauren (2026). "Chapter 20. Salome G. Waelsch". Women Laureates 1970-2007: National Medal of Science and National Medal of Technology and Innovation Winners. Springer Nature. ISBN 978-3-032-23115-4.
