= Robert E. Connick =

- Born: July 29, 1917; Humboldt, California, United States
- Died: August 21, 2014 (aged 97); Contra Costa, California, United States
- Education: University of California, Berkeley
- Awards: G.N. Lewis Award (1968); Guggenheim Fellowship (1948,1958)
- Scientific career
- Fields: Chemistry

Robert E. Connick (July 29, 1917 – August 21, 2014) was a professor emeritus of chemistry at the University of California, Berkeley.

== Life ==
Connick studied chemistry at Berkeley, receiving his B.S. in 1939 and his Ph.D. in 1942. He was a research associate on the Manhattan Project from 1943 - 1946, and has been a professor, chair of the chemistry department, dean of the college of chemistry, vice chancellor, and chair of the academic senate at both Berkeley and the entire University of California system.

His research led to growth and improvement in inorganic reaction kinetics and mechanisms. He is most known for development of nuclear magnetic resonance methods for determining rates of water exchange reactions. During his time with the Manhattan Project, Connick contributed research to the fundamental chemical properties of plutonium, during a time when only minute amounts were accessible, and helped devise its separation techniques. Connick’s studies revealed plutonium’s complicated oxidation-reduction properties and the existence of many ions. The results showed scientific basis for the various practical separation processes developed during and since World War II.

He was elected to the National Academy of Sciences in 1963. He was a 1968 G.N. Lewis Lecturer and Awardee. He was a two-time Guggenheim Fellow, in 1948 and 1958. Connick also served as a Counselor for the Save the Redwoods League. Connick died at the age of 97 in 2014.
