= Claire E. Eyers =

British biological mass spectrometrist

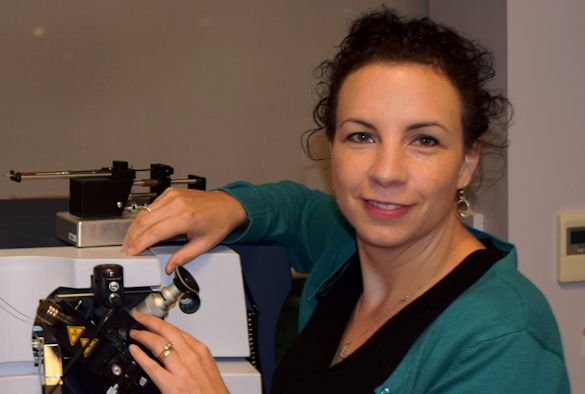
Professor Claire Eyers

Claire E. Eyers (née Haydon) is a British biological mass spectrometrist who is professor of biological mass spectrometry in the Department of Biochemistry, Cell and Systems Biology, University of Liverpool part of the Institute of Systems, Molecular and Integrative Biology at the University of Liverpool, where she Directs the Centre for Proteome Research. Her research publications list her either as Claire E Haydon (her maiden name) or Claire E Eyers (from 2005). She is currently Associate Pro-Vice-Chancellor for Research and Impact (HLS) and Professor of Biological Mass Spectrometry in the Faculty of Health and Life Sciences at the University of Liverpool.

== Early life and education ==
Eyers was born in London and educated at Putney High School. She was awarded a BSc Honours in Biochemistry with Industrial experience Rhône-Poulenc from the University of Bristol in 1998 prior to undertaking postgraduate studies in the MRC PPU at the University of Dundee where she was awarded a PhD in 2002 for her work on stress-activated protein kinases with Sir Philip Cohen. Her interests in protein phosphorylation and biological mass spectrometry have subsequently led to a series of professional appointments, including (in 2017) an Invited Member of the Scientific Advisory Group of the Human Proteome Organization (HUPO), the Editorial Board of Scientific Reports (2017–) and Journal of Proteome Research, and as an Executive committee & Trustee of the British Mass Spectrometry Society (2015–), for whom she was also Treasurer between 2016 and 2018.

== Career and research ==
Following her PhD in Dundee, Eyers joined the group of Professor Natalie Ahn in the USA, and was awarded an Outstanding Postdoctoral Fellow Award (Pacific/Mountain Affiliate) of the American Heart Association (2004), held at the University of Colorado Boulder. Subsequently, in 2005, she returned to the UK to take up a position with Professor Simon Gaskell as Deputy Head of the Michael Barber Centre for Mass Spectrometry at the University of Manchester. Her work in Manchester, a national and international centre of excellence for mass spectrometry best known for the development of fast atom bombardment (FAB), involved the development, refinement and application of strategies for protein quantification by mass spectrometry, and gas-phase characterisation of modified peptides and glycans. During her time in Manchester, she also contributed to securing the first bronze (2011) and subsequently silver (2013) and then GOLD Athena SWAN (Scientific Women's Academic Network) award for the School of Chemistry and Faculty of Health and Life Sciences, University of Liverpool. In 2007, Eyers was awarded a personal Royal Society Dorothy Hodgkin Fellowship to set up her own research proteomics laboratory, and was promoted to Senior Lecturer in 2010. Since 2014, she has been the Professor of Biological Mass Spectrometry in the Faculty of Health and Life Sciences at the University of Liverpool and is currently Director of the Centre for Proteome Research. and a founder member of the Workload Model Working Group, which oversaw a charter Gold ranking Athena SWAN award for the IIB and later ISMIB, both firsts for the University of Liverpool. Eyers sits on the Selection Committee for L'Oréal-UNESCO For Women in Science, Professional Body Memberships and is a member of the Royal Society of Chemistry, the American Society for Mass Spectrometry, the British Society for Proteome Research (a member of the UK Biosciences Federation), the British Mass Spectrometry Society and the UK Biochemical Society. Her expertise in protein phosphorylation and biological mass spectrometry have resulted in a number of professional appointments. She is a Former Chair of BBSRC Committee D. Alongside Professors Sabine Flitsch and Perdita Barran, Eyers is also Co-founder and Scientific Director of Bio-Shape Ltd, a company specialising in the analysis of proteins, carbohydrates and their conjugates using mass spectrometry-based methods.

Eyers' work in biological mass spectrometry focuses on the global and targeted analysis of post-translational modification on proteins. She has published over peer-reviewed 150 research articles, has edited two books ('Quantitative Proteomics' published by RSC Press and 'Histidine Phosphorylation: Methods and Protocols published by Springer Press) and she currently holds two patents. Her most cited publications focus on biochemical, structural, cellular and gas-phase studies of protein phosphorylation, protein kinase complexes and glycan conformation, and several highly-accessed reviews on the subject of ion mobility mass spectrometry for biological molecules. She is highly cited for her analysis of protein phosphorylation by mass spectrometry, and in 2019 work in her lab led to the discovery that non-canonical protein phosphorylation on a broad range of amino acids, including Arg, Asp, Cys, Glu, His and Lys is widespread in human cells. This work potentially opens up an entirely new field of 'non-canonical' protein phosphorylation analysis in prokaryotic and eukaryotic organisms, where protein phosphorylation represents a reversible switch that transmits intracellular signals in response to extracellular factors.

In 2022, Eyers was appointed to the Liverpool City Region Local Enterprise Partnership (LEP) Health and Life Sciences sub-board which aims to support the growth of the Health and Life Sciences sectors in the local area as well as providing support and access to the extensive knowledge and expertise across the Liverpool City region.

== Awards and honours ==
Eyers received the Outstanding Postdoctoral Fellow Award (Pacific/Mountain Affiliate) of the American Heart Association (2004), when working in the laboratory of Professor Natalie Ahn, at the University of Colorado Boulder. Eyers is the 2020 British Society for Proteome Research Named Lecturer. In her role as the BSPR Lecturer, Eyers will be presenting a series of lectures during 2020 and 2021 focused on phosphoproteomics and post translational modification analysis of proteins.

- Winner of the RSC's 2022 Chemistry Biology Interface Division mid-career Award: Jeremy Knowles Award
