= J Bernadette Moore =

Irish nutritional scientist

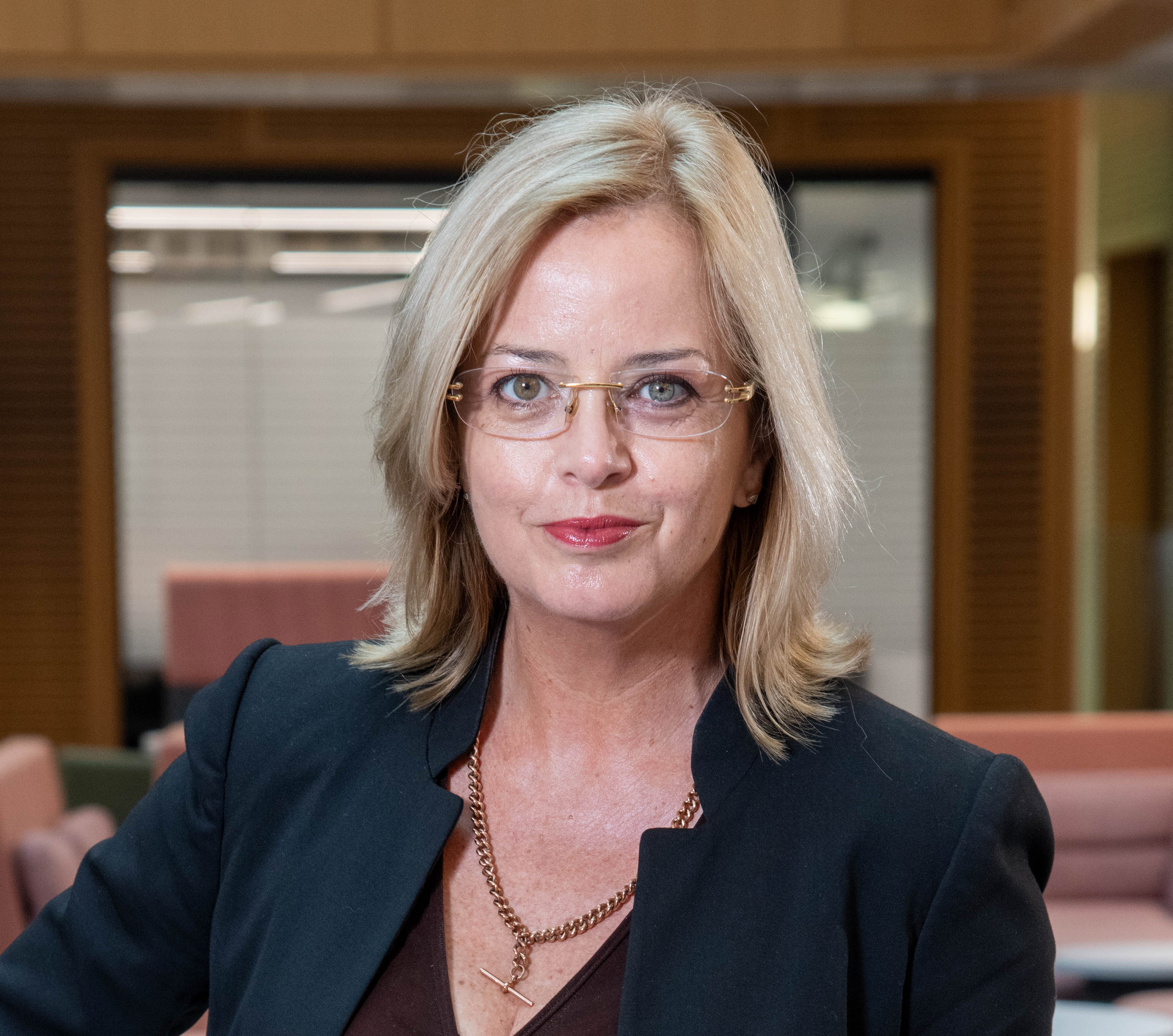
Professor J Bernadette Moore

J Bernadette Moore is an Irish nutritional academic research scientist who is Chair in Nutritional Biochemistry in the Department of Biochemistry, Cell and Systems Biology, University of Liverpool, part of the broader Institute of Systems, Molecular and Integrative Biology at the University of Liverpool, UK.

== Early life and education ==
Born in Ireland, Moore's family moved to America when she was 12. Mentored by the eminent nutritional biochemist, Professor Robert J. Cousins she earned her Ph.D. from the University of Florida in 2002 for work that uncovered novel molecular mechanisms underpinning the role of dietary zinc on the vertebrate immune system.

== Graduate and early postgraduate research ==
She was awarded the Christine Mirzayan Science Policy fellowship of the National Academies of Sciences, Engineering, and Medicine soon after completing her PhD in 2003, and worked initially as an Intern at the National Academies in Washington DC, where her interests in science policy and the prevention of childhood obesity were fostered while working as a staff member on the Institute of Medicine Committee on Prevention of Obesity in Children and Youth.

== Mid-career ==
After subsequent postdoctoral research, first as an intramural fellow at the NIH in Bethesda, Maryland and then as a Marie Curie Transfer of Knowledge fellow at NUI-Maynooth University in Ireland, Moore moved to the UK to set-up and lead her first UK laboratory in 2008 at the University of Surrey, studying steatotic, or fatty, liver disease. with a focus on what was then termed nonalcoholic fatty liver disease (NAFLD), now the most common cause of liver disease, affecting an estimated 30% of adults and 10% of children worldwide and now re-named metabolic-dysfunction associated steatotic liver disease (MASLD). In 2016 she moved to the University of Leeds, where she held multiple leadership positions and was promoted to Professor.

== Elected Positions and Chair of Nutritional Biochemistry at the University of Liverpool ==
Moore has held elected positions on the Advisory Councils for both the Nutrition Society and the British Association for Parenteral and Enteral Nutrition (BAPEN), and was a General Assembly Member of the European Food Information Council (EUFIC). In 2018, she was the recipient of the Nutrition Society Silver Medal for Research Excellence in a Young Investigator. Her work on the nutrient content (total sugar, fat, protein, calcium and energy content) of UK supermarket yogurts received significant scientific and media interest, concluding that yogurt products varied widely in total sugar content and that reformulation to reduce free sugars was warranted. This is correlated with a highly statistically-significant reduction (median sugar reduced by 13% in two years) in the sugar-content of yogurt products sold in the UK between 2016 and 2019. In 2024, she took up the Chair in Nutritional Biochemistry in Department of Biochemistry, Cell and Systems Biology, University of Liverpool at the University of Liverpool to continue her multidisciplinary work on the molecular mechanisms underpinning the roles of dietary nutrients in health and disease, with a focus on non-alcoholic fatty liver disease, healthy lifestyles in the context of clinically-approved GLP-1 Receptor agonists, commonly employed as weight loss medications and antioxidant/healthy ageing studies in the context of the amino acid Ergothioneine, which is found at elevated concentrations in the fruiting bodies of some mushrooms.
