= Ferdinand Brickwedde =

American physicist

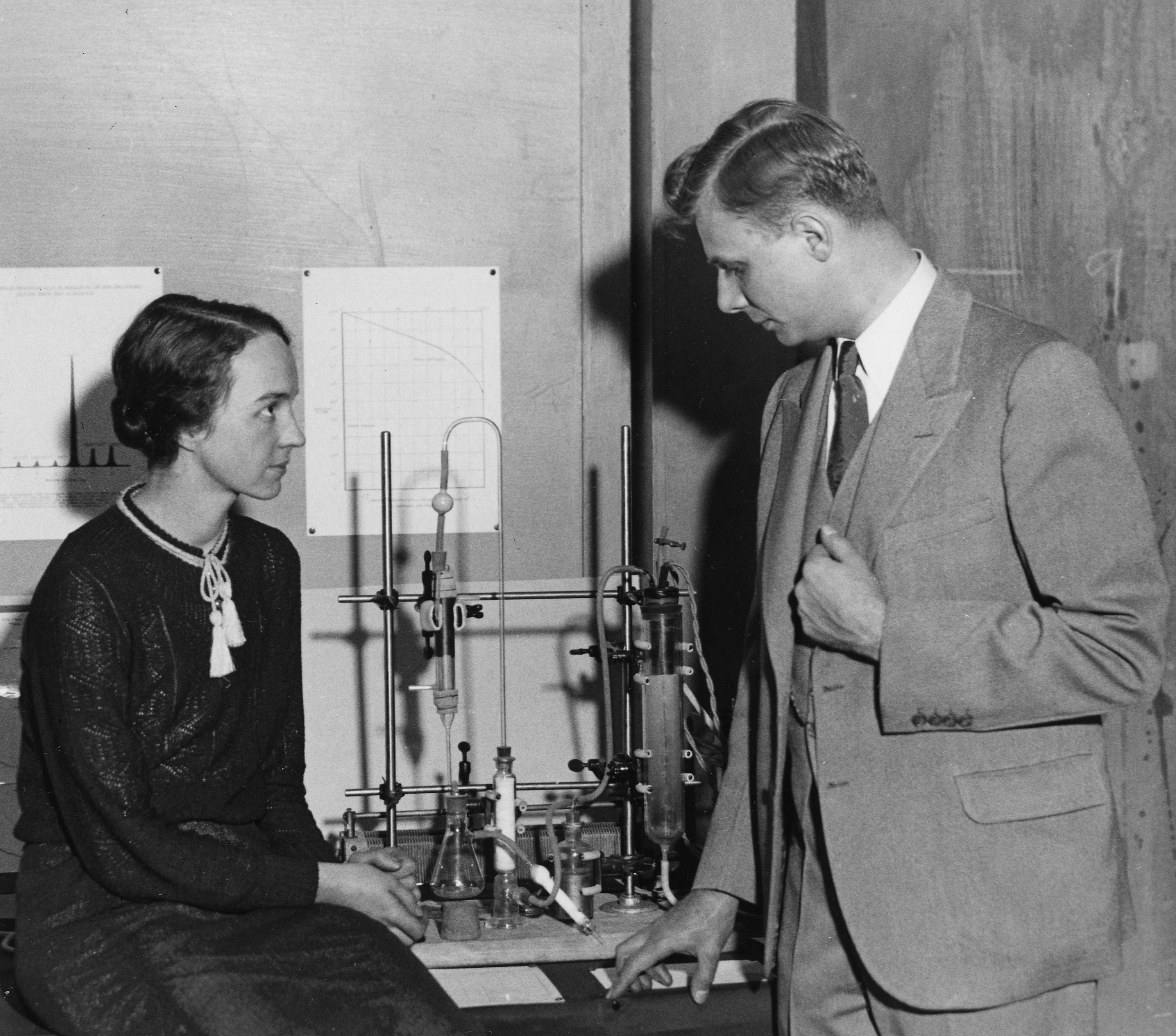
Ferdinand G. Brickwedde with his wife, physicist Marion Langhorne Howard Brickwedde (1909–1997). Between them is the apparatus for making heavy water.

Ferdinand Graft Brickwedde (26 March 1903 – 29 March 1989), a physicist at the National Bureau of Standards (now the National Institute of Standards and Technology), in 1931 produced the first sample of hydrogen in which the spectrum of its heavy isotope, deuterium, could be observed. This was a critical step in the discovery of deuterium, for which Brickwedde's collaborator, Harold Urey, was awarded the Nobel Prize in Chemistry in 1934.

== Biography ==
He was born on 26 March 1903 in Baltimore, Maryland. His parents were the photographer Ferdinand Henry (* 1878 in New York) and Virginia (Graft) Brickwedde (* 1874 in Illinois). He was married to physicist Marion Langhorne Howard Birckwedde.

Brickwedde was educated at Johns Hopkins University, B.A. 1922, M.A. 1924, and Ph.D. 1925. An endowed lectureship in his name is maintained there. In 1925 he joined the National Bureau of Standards as a postdoctoral Mansell Research Associate, was promoted to Chief of its Low Temperature Laboratory in 1926, and became Chief of its Heat and Power Division in 1946.

In 1939, Brickwedde served as president of the Philosophical Society of Washington, a scientific organization. In 1956, Brickwedde was appointed dean of the college of chemistry and physics at the Pennsylvania State University. He served in this position until 1963, and then was appointed Evan Pugh Research Professor of Physics Emeritus, in which position he served until his death on 29 March 1989 in Linwood, New Jersey.
