= Roy Goodacre =

British Metabolomic expert and Mass Spectrometrist

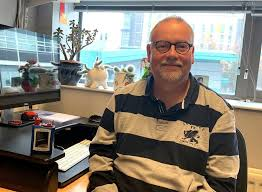
- Born: Changi, Singapore
- Education: Bristol University (BSc, PhD)
- Awards: FACSS Charles Mann Award (2021); RSC Robert Boyle Prize (2021); RSC Bioanalytical Chemistry Award (2005)
- Scientific career
- Fields: Metabolomics; Mass Spectrometry; Raman Spectroscopy; Surface-enhanced Raman spectroscopy; Chemometrics; Multivariate Analysis; Machine learning
- Workplaces: Aberystwyth University; UMIST; University of Manchester; University of Liverpool
- Thesis: The Effects of Genotypic and Phenotypic Changes on Bacterial Identification using Pyrolysis Mass Spectrometry
- Website: http://www.biospec.net

Royston "Roy" Goodacre FRSC FLSW is Chair in Biological Chemistry at the University of Liverpool. With training in both Microbiology and Pyrolysis-Mass Spectrometry, Goodacre runs a multidisciplinary Metabolomics and Raman spectroscopy research group in the Department of Biochemistry, Cell and Systems Biology, University of Liverpool part of the Institute of Systems, Molecular and Integrative Biology (ISMIB), and leads ISMIB's Centre for Metabolomics Research and the Laboratory for Bioanalytical Spectroscopy.

== Early life and education ==
Goodacre was born in Changi, Singapore, lived in Llantwit Major and was educated from 1978 at the Monmouth School, in Wales, where he went on to study Biology, Chemistry and Mathematics at 'A' level. He received a 2i-class honours degree in Microbiology from the University of Bristol, where he was a student at Badock Hall Halls of residence at the University of Bristol, and remained to study for a PhD in pyrolysis-MS for bacterial identification with the bacteriologist Dr Roger Berkeley at the University of Bristol, defending his thesis in 1992. While in Bristol he met his wife: they married in 1991, celebrating 30 years of marriage in 2021, and have one daughter.

Roy Goodacre taking Raman measurements from pigments in Aboriginal Rock Art, Australia

== Career ==
Following his PhD, Goodacre took up a postdoctoral research position at Aberystwyth University between 1992 and 1995, and began his own research laboratory in 1995, with the award of a Wellcome Trust Research Career Development Fellowship, which he held until 1999, when he received tenure as a lecturer in Microbiology at Aberystwyth University. He moved to UMIST, which merged to become the University of Manchester, first as Reader in Analytical Science (Dept. of Chemistry, 2003–05) and then as Professor of Biological Chemistry, from 2005 to 2018. Goodacre was then recruited to the University of Liverpool to become Director of the Centre for Metabolomics Research (2018-).

Goodacre is the founder and current Editor-in-Chief of the peer-reviewed scientific journal Metabolomics. He is an Editorial Advisory Board member for the following journals: Analyst (2014-); Journal of Analytical and Applied Pyrolysis (1997-2025); Spectrochimica Acta A: Molecular and Biomolecular Spectroscopy (2016-).

Goodacre is a Founder and Director of the Metabolomics Society (2005–15, 2020–26) and served as President from 2022 to 2024. Since 2008 he is also a Director of the Metabolic Profiling Forum.

He served as a Committee member of Royal Society of Chemistry's Analytical Division Council (2019–22).

Since 2019 Goodacre has been a Trustee of the Analytical Chemistry Trust Fund (ACTF).

Goodacre has supervised, and graduated, 64 PhD, 9 MSc, 3 MPhil and 16 MChem postgraduate students.

Goodacre is known for innovative science teaching and scholarship, including the incorporation of music into formal lecture schedules, partly to aid mental well-being.

=== Awards and honours ===
- The Nils Foss Excellence Prize 2021.
- FACSS Charles Mann Award for Applied Raman Spectroscopy (2021).
- RSC Analytical Division Horizon Prize: Robert Boyle Prize for Analytical Science (2021).
- The Analytical Scientist Power Lists in 2019, 2020, 2021 and 2023
- RSC Bioanalytical Chemistry Award (2005).
- Recipient of the Third Professor S. Ramaseshan Distinguished Lecture. AstraZeneca Research Foundation India, Bangalore, India (2004).

== Research ==
Goodacre started Metabolomics research in the early 2000s with Douglas Kell. He helped to develop long-term metabolomics which allows fusion of GC-MS and LC-MS data collected over 12–24 months - which is based on mathematical corrections which effectively removes any (unavoidable) chromatographic and mass spectrometry instrumental drift. This approach has been applied to generate profiles from ~1200 normal human serum samples and to investigate human frailty in ageing populations of approx. 2000 individuals.

Standardisation in Metabolomics is important and Goodacre was part of the Metabolomics Standards Initiative (MSI) which help establish metabolite identification reporting standards, which have been very well adopted by the field. He chaired part of the MSI's data analysis workgroup and these minimum reporting standards were published.

Goodacre was the first to show that surface-enhanced Raman scattering can be used for bacterial identification and to use Spatially Offset Raman spectroscopy for through-container authentication of spirit drinks.

As of 2020, Goodacre has authored 3 international patents, published over 500 peer-reviewed research articles and has an H-index of over 100 (see Google Scholar), and edited two books on metabolomics.
