= Carbohydrate Research =

- Discipline: Biochemistry
- Language: English
- Edited by: R. Field

Publication details
- History: 1965-present
- Publisher: Elsevier
- Frequency: 18/year
- Impact factor: 3.1 (2022)

Standard abbreviations
- ISO 4: Carbohydr. Res.

Indexing
- CODEN: CRBRAT
- ISSN: 0008-6215
- LCCN: 65009978
- OCLC no.: 01553338

Links
- Journal homepage; Online archive

Carbohydrate Research is a peer-reviewed scientific journal covering research on the chemistry of carbohydrates. It is published by Elsevier and was established in 1965. The editor-in-chief is M. Carmen Galan (University of Bristol). According to the Journal Citation Reports, the journal has a 2022 impact factor of 3.1.
