= Metabolomics (journal) =

- Discipline: Biology, Analytical Chemistry
- Language: English

Publication details
- History: 2005–present
- Publisher: Springer
- Impact factor: 3.167 (2018)

Standard abbreviations
- ISO 4: Metabolomics

Indexing
- ISSN: 1573-3882 (print); 1573-3890 (web)

Links
- Journal homepage

Metabolomics is a peer-reviewed scientific journal covering topics including whole metabolome analysis of organisms, metabolite target analysis, with applications within animals, plants and microbes, pharmacometabolomics for precision medicine, as well as systems biology. It is published by Springer Science+Business Media and the current editor-in-chief is Roy Goodacre.

The 2018 impact factor was 3.167.
