= David Rittenberg =

American biochemist

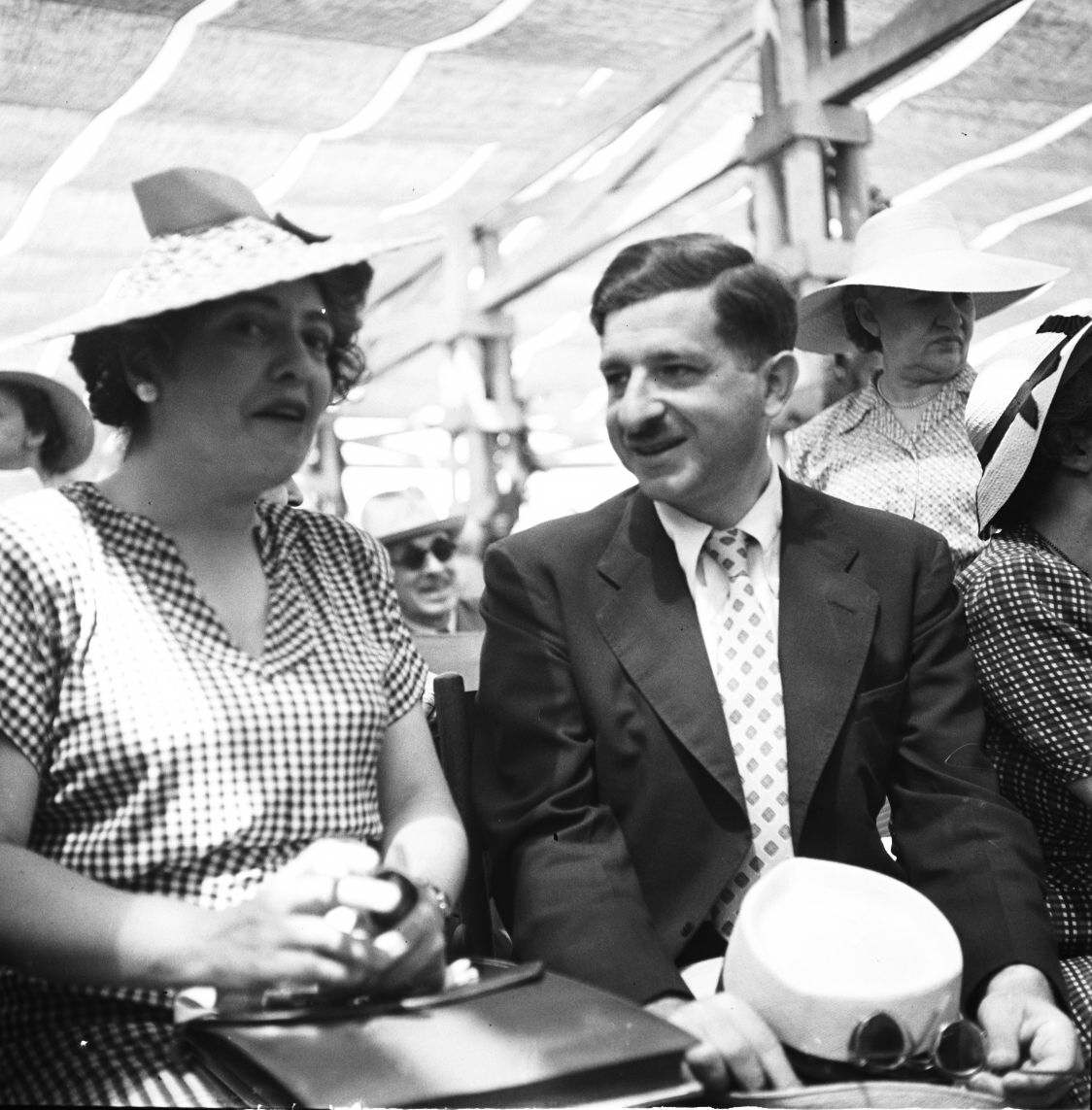
- David Rittenberg at Weizmann Institute of Science cornerstone laying ceremony 1946
- Born: November 11, 1906; New York
- Died: January 24, 1970 (aged 63); New York
- Education: City College of New York, B.S. 1929, Columbia University, Ph.D. 1935
- Known for: Isotope tracer method
- Awards: Eli Lilly Award in Biological Chemistry (1941)
- Scientific career
- Fields: Biochemistry
- Workplaces: College of Physicians and Surgeons, Columbia University, U.S. Bureau of Mines, Rutgers University
- Thesis: Some Equilibria Involving Isotopes of Hydrogen
- Doctoral advisor: Harold Urey

David Rittenberg (November 11, 1906 – January 24, 1970) was an American biochemist who pioneered the isotopic tagging of molecules. He was born and died in New York, and spent almost the whole of his life there. He obtained his B.S. in 1929 from the City College of New York, and his Ph.D. in 1935 at Columbia University under the supervision of Harold Urey.

== Research on isotopes as tracers ==
Rittenberg's doctoral work concerned thermodynamic properties of molecules containing ^{2}H (deuterium), and he built his career principally on work with isotopes.

His introduction of the use of ^{2}H as a tracer to follow the fate of various different compounds in human metabolism changed the prevailing scientific theory, from a static, "wear and tear" view of metabolic processes, to a dynamic theory in which there is constant and rapid buildup and degradation of body constituents.

In their Biographical Memoir David Shemin and Ronald Bentley described the approach in these terms:

The metabolites containing ^{2}H had properties essentially indistinguishable from their natural analogs by the methods commonly used. Nevertheless, the presence of the isotope made it possible to trace their metabolic fate. Thus, if a ^{2}H-containing compound, B, was isolated after feeding the ^{2}H-labeled compound, A, to an animal, the metabolic conversion A → B was established. Prophetically, these authors noted that "the number of possible applications of this method appears to be almost unlimited." Subsequent developments have shown that they were true prophets.

From 1935 onwards Schoenheimer and Rittenberg published a long series of papers in the Journal of Biological Chemistry on the general topic of ^{2}H as an indicator in the study of intermediary metabolism, starting with a general introduction to the topic, and continuing to 1938 with a study of hydrogen in amino acids.

From 1939 onwards Schoenheimer and Rittenberg continued on the same road with a further long series of papers in the Journal of Biological Chemistry on protein metabolism, starting by describing some general considerations.

== Weizmann Institute ==
Although Rittenberg remained throughout his career at Columbia University, he also participated in the early years of the Weizmann Institute in Rehovot, Israel, first as a member of the Planning Board and later as a member of the Board of Governors. He was made an honorary fellow of the institute in 1967. Later he joined the advisory board of the Hadassah Medical School in Jerusalem.
