= Pharmacometabolomics =

Pharmacometabolomics, also known as pharmacometabonomics, is a field which stems from metabolomics, the quantification and analysis of metabolites produced by the body. It refers to the direct measurement of metabolites in an individual's bodily fluids, in order to predict or evaluate the metabolism of pharmaceutical compounds, and to better understand the pharmacokinetic profile of a drug. Alternatively, pharmacometabolomics can be applied to measure metabolite levels following the administration of a pharmaceutical compound, in order to monitor the effects of the compound on certain metabolic pathways(pharmacodynamics). This provides detailed mapping of drug effects on metabolism and the pathways that are implicated in mechanism of variation of response to treatment. In addition, the metabolic profile of an individual at baseline (metabotype) provides information about how individuals respond to treatment and highlights heterogeneity within a disease state. All three approaches require the quantification of metabolites found in bodily fluids and tissue, such as blood or urine, and can be used in the assessment of pharmaceutical treatment options for numerous disease states.

== Goals of Pharmacometabolomics ==
Pharmacometabolomics is thought to provide information that complements that gained from other omics, namely genomics, transcriptomics, and proteomics. Looking at the characteristics of an individual down through these different levels of detail, there is an increasingly more accurate prediction of a person's ability to respond to a pharmaceutical compound. The genome, made up of 25 000 genes, can indicate possible errors in drug metabolism; the transcriptome, made up of 85,000 transcripts, can provide information about which genes important in metabolism are being actively transcribed; and the proteome, >10,000,000 members, depicts which proteins are active in the body to carry out these functions. Pharmacometabolomics complements the omics with direct measurement of the products of all of these reactions, but with perhaps a relatively smaller number of members: that was initially projected to be approximately 2200 metabolites, but could be a larger number when gut derived metabolites and xenobiotics are added to the list. Overall, the goal of pharmacometabolomics is to more closely predict or assess the response of an individual to a pharmaceutical compound, permitting continued treatment with the right drug or dosage depending on the variations in their metabolism and ability to respond to treatment.

Pharmacometabolomic analyses, through the use of a metabolomics approach, can provide a comprehensive and detailed metabolic profile or "metabolic fingerprint" for an individual patient. Such metabolic profiles can provide a complete overview of individual metabolite or pathway alterations, providing a more realistic depiction of disease phenotypes. This approach can then be applied to the prediction of response to a pharmaceutical compound by patients with a particular metabolic profile. Pharmacometabolomic analyses of drug response are often coupled or followed up with pharmacogenetics studies. Pharmacogenetics focuses on the identification of genetic variations (e.g. single-nucleotide polymorphisms) within patients that may contribute to altered drug responses and overall outcome of a certain treatment. The results of pharmacometabolomics analyses can act to "inform" or "direct" pharmacogenetic analyses by correlating aberrant metabolite concentrations or metabolic pathways to potential alterations at the genetic level. This concept has been established with two seminal publications from studies of antidepressants serotonin reuptake inhibitors where metabolic signatures were able to define pathway implicated in response to the antidepressant and that lead to identification of genetic variants within a key gene within highlighted pathway as being implicated in variation in response. These genetic variants were not identified through genetic analysis alone and hence illustrated how metabolomics can guide and inform genetic data.

== History ==
Although the applications of pharmacometabolomics to personalized medicine are largely only being realized now, the study of an individual's metabolism has been used to treat disease since the Middle Ages. Early physicians employed a primitive form of metabolomic analysis by smelling, tasting and looking at urine to diagnose disease. Obviously the measurement techniques needed to look at specific metabolites were unavailable at that time, but such technologies have evolved dramatically over the last decade to develop precise, high-throughput devices, as well as the accompanying data analysis software to analyze output. Currently, sample purification processes, such as liquid or gas chromatography, are coupled with either mass spectrometry (MS)-based or nuclear magnetic resonance (NMR)-based analytical methods to characterize the metabolite profiles of individual patients. Continually advancing informatics tools allow for the identification, quantification and classification of metabolites to determine which pathways may influence certain pharmaceutical interventions. One of the earliest studies discussing the principle and applications of pharmacometabolomics was conducted in an animal model to look at the metabolism of paracetamol and liver damage. NMR spectroscopy was used to analyze the urinary metabolic profiles of rats pre- and post-treatment with paracetamol. The analysis revealed a certain metabolic profile associated with increased liver damage following paracetamol treatment. At this point, it was eagerly anticipated that such pharmacometabolomics approaches could be applied to personalized human medicine. Since this publication in 2006, the Pharmacometabolomics Research Network led by Duke University researchers and that included partnerships between centers of excellence in metabolomics, pharmacogenomics and informatics (over sixteen academic centers funded by NIGMS) has been able to illustrate for the first time the power of the pharmacometabolomics approach in informing about treatment outcomes in large clinical studies and with use of drugs that include antidepressants, statins, antihypertensives, antiplatelet therapies and antipsychotics. Totally new concepts emerged from these studies on use of pharmacometabolomics as a tool that can bring a paradigm shift in the field of pharmacology. It illustrated how pharmacometabolomics can enable a Quantitative and Systems Pharmacology approach. Pharmacometabolomics has been applied for the treatment of numerous human diseases, such as schizophrenia, diabetes, neural disease, depression and cancer.

== Personalized Medicine ==
As metabolite analyses are being conducted at the individual patient level, pharmacometabolomics may be considered a form of personalized medicine. This field is currently being employed in a predictive manner to determine the potential responses of therapeutic compounds in individual patients, allowing for more customized treatment regimens. It is anticipated that such pharmacometabolomics approaches will lead to the improved ability to predict an individual's response to a compound, the efficacy and metabolism of it as well as adverse or off-target effects that may take place in the body. The metabolism of certain drugs varies from patient to patient as the copy number of the genes which code for common drug metabolizing enzymes varies within the population, and leads to differences in the ability of an individual to metabolize different compounds. Other important personal factors contributing to an individual's metabolic profile, such as patient nutritional status, commensal bacteria, age, and pre-existing medical conditions, are also reflected in metabolite assessment., Overall, pharmacometabolomic analyses combined with such approaches as pharmacogenetics, can function to identify the metabolic processes and particular genetic alterations that may compromise the anticipated efficacy of a drug in a particular patient. The results of such analyses can then allow modification of treatment regimens for an optimal outcome.

== Current Applications ==
=== Predicting treatment outcome ===
==== Metabotype informs about treatment outcomes ====
Pharmacometabolomics may be used in a predictive manner to determine the correct course of action in regards to a patient about to undergo some type of drug treatment. This involves determining the metabolic profile of a patient prior to treatment, and correlating metabolic signatures with the outcome of a pharmaceutical treatment course. Analysis of a patient's metabolic profile can reveal factors that may contribute to altered drug metabolism, allowing for predictions of the overall efficacy of a proposed treatment, as well as potential drug toxicity risks that may differ from the general population. This approach has been used to identify novel or previously characterized metabolic biomarkers in patients, which can be used to predict the expected outcome of that patient following treatment with a pharmaceutical compound. One example of the clinical application of pharmacometabolomics are studies that looked to identify a predictive metabolic marker for the treatment of major depressive disorder (MDD)., In a study with antidepressant Sertraline, the Pharmacometabolomics Network illustrated that metabolic profile at baseline of patients with major depression can inform about treatment outcomes. In addition the study illustrated the power of metabolomics for defining response to placebo and compared response to placebo to response to sertraline and showed that several pathways were common to both. In another study with escitalopram citalopram, metabolomic analysis of plasma from patients with MDD revealed that variations in glycine metabolism were negatively associated with patient outcome upon treatment with selective serotonin reuptake inhibitors (SSRIs), an important drug class involved in the treatment of this disease.

=== Monitoring drug-related alterations in metabolic pathways ===
The second major application of pharmacometabolomics is the analysis of a patient's metabolic profile following the administration of a specific therapy. This process is often secondary to a pre-treatment metabolic analysis, allowing for the comparison of pre- and post-treatment metabolite concentrations. This allows for the identification of the metabolic processes and pathways that are being altered by the treatment either intentionally as a designated target of the compound, or unintentionally as a side effect. Furthermore, the concentration and variety of metabolites produced from the compound itself can also be identified, providing information on the rate of metabolism and potentially leading to development of a related compound with increased efficacy or decreased side effects. An example of this approach was used to investigate the effect of several antipsychotic drugs on lipid metabolism in patients treated for schizophrenia. It was hypothesized that these antipsychotic drugs may be altering lipid metabolism in treated patients with schizophrenia, contributing to the weight gain and hypertriglyceridemia. The study monitored lipid metabolites in patients both before and after treatment with antipsychotics. The compiled pre- and post-treatment profiles were then compared to examine the effect of these compounds on lipid metabolism. The researchers found correlations between treatment with antipsychotic drugs and lipid metabolism, in both a lipid-class-specific and drug-specific manner, establishing new foundations around the concept that pharmacometabolomics provides powerful tools for enabling detailed mapping of drug effects. Additional studies by the Pharmacometabolomics Research Network enabled mapping in ways not possible before effects of statins, atenolol and aspirin. Totally new insights were gained about effect of these drugs on metabolism and they highlighted pathways implicated in response and side effects.

== Metabolite Quantification and Analysis ==
In order to identify and quantify metabolites produced by the body, various detection methods have been employed. Most often, these involve the use of nuclear magnetic resonance (NMR) spectroscopy or mass spectrometry (MS), providing universal detection, identification and quantification of metabolites in individual patient samples. Although both processes are used in pharmacometabolomic analyses, there are advantages and disadvantages for using either nuclear magnetic resonance (NMR) spectroscopy- or mass spectrometry (MS)-based platforms in this application.

=== Nuclear Magnetic Resonance Spectroscopy ===
NMR spectroscopy has been utilized for the analysis of biological samples since the 1980s, and can be used as an effective technique for the identification and quantification of both known and unknown metabolites. For details on the principles of this technique, see NMR spectroscopy. In pharmacometabolomics analyses, NMR is advantageous because minimal sample preparation is required. Isolated patient samples typically include blood or urine due to their minimally-invasive acquisition, however, other fluid types and solid tissue samples have also been studied with this approach. Due to the minimal preparation of samples before analysis, samples can be potentially fully recovered following NMR analysis (If samples are kept refrigerated to avoid degradation). This permits samples to be repeatedly analysed with extremely high levels of reproducibility, as well as maintaining precious patient samples for an alternative analysis. The high reproducibility and precision of NMR, coupled with relatively fast processing time (greater than 100 samples per day), makes this process a relatively high-throughput form of sample analysis. One disadvantage of this technique is the relatively poor metabolite detection sensitivity compared to MS-based analysis, leading to a requirement for greater initial sample volume. Furthermore, the initial instrument costs are extremely high, for both NMR and MS equipment.

=== Mass Spectrometry ===
An alternative approach to the identification and quantification of patient samples is through the use of mass spectrometry. This approach offers excellent precision and sensitivity in the identification, characterization and quantification of metabolites in multiple patient sample types, such as blood and urine. The mass spectrometry (MS) approach is typically coupled to gas chromatography (GC), in GC-MS or liquid chromatography (LC), in LC-MS, which aid in initially separating out the metabolite components within complex sample mixtures, and can allow for the isolation of particular metabolite subsets for analysis. GC-MS can provide relatively precise quantification of metabolites, as well as chemical structural information that can be compared to pre-existing chemical libraries. GC-MS can be conducted in a relatively high-throughput manner (greater than 100 samples per day) with greater detection sensitivity than NMR analysis. A limitation of GC-MS for this application, however, is that processed metabolite components must be readily volatilized for sample processing.

LC-MS initially separates out the components of a sample mixture based on properties such as hydrophobicity, before processing them for identification and quantification by mass spectrometry (MS). Overall, LC-MS is an extremely flexible method for processing most compound types in a somewhat high-throughput manner (20-100 samples a day), also with greater sensitivity than NMR analysis. For both GC-MS and LC-MS there are limitations in the reproducibility of metabolite quantification. Furthermore, sample processing for downstream mass spectrometry (MS) analysis is much more intensive than in NMR application, and results in the destruction of the original sample (via trypsin digestion).

Following identification and quantification of metabolites in individual patient samples, NMR and mass spectrometry (MS) output is compiled into a dataset. These datasets include information on the identity and levels of individual metabolites detected within processed samples, as well as characteristics of each metabolite during the detection process (e.g. mass-to-charge ratios for mass spectrometry (MS)-based analysis). Multiple datasets can be created and compiled into large databases for individual patients in order to monitor varying metabolic profiles over a treatment course (i.e. pre- and post-treatment profiles). Each database is then processed through a type of informatics platform with software designed to characterize and analyze the data to generate an overall metabolic profile for the patient. To generate this overall profile, computational programs are designed to:

- identify metabolic disease signatures
- assess treatment class (pre- or post-treatment)
- identify compounds present in a patient sample that may alter drug response, or be caused by a therapy
- identify metabolite variables and interactions among these variables
- map identified variables to known metabolic and biochemical pathways

== Limitations ==
Along with the emerging diagnostic capabilities of pharmacometabolomics, there are limitations introduced when individual variability is looked at. The ability to determine an individual's physiological state by measurement of metabolites is not contested, but the extreme variability that can be introduced by age, nutrition, and commensal organisms suggest problems in creating generalized pharmacometabolomes for patient groups. However, as long as meaningful metabolic signatures can be elucidated to create baseline values, there still exists a possible means of comparison.

Issues surrounding the measurement of metabolites in an individual can also arise from the methodology of metabolite detection, and there are arguments both for and against NMR and mass spectrometry (MS). Other limitations surrounding metabolite analysis include the need for proper handling and processing of samples, as well as proper maintenance and calibration of the analytical and computational equipment. These tasks require skilled and experienced technicians, and potential instrument repair costs due to continuous sample processing can be costly. The cost of the processing and analytical platforms alone is very high, making it difficult for many facilities to afford pharmacometabolomics-based treatment analyses.

== Implications for Health Care ==
Pharmacometabolomics may decrease the burden on the healthcare system by better gauging the correct choice of treatment drug and dosage in order to optimize the response of a patient to a treatment. Hopefully, this approach will also ultimately limit the number of adverse drug reactions (ADRs) associated with many treatment regimens. Overall, physicians would be better able to apply more personalized, and potentially more effective, treatments to their patients. It is important to consider, however, that the processing and analysis of the patient samples takes time, resulting in delayed treatment. Another concern about the application of pharmacometabolomics analyses to individual patient care, is deciding who should and who should not receive this in-depth, personalized treatment protocol. Certain diseases and stages of disease would have to be classified according to their requirement of such a treatment plan, but there are no criteria for this classification. Furthermore, not all hospitals and treatment institutes can afford the equipment to process and analyze patient samples on site, but sending out samples takes time and ultimately delays treatment. Health insurance coverage of such procedures may also be an issue. Certain insurance companies may discriminate against the application of this type of sample analysis and metabolite characterization. Furthermore, there would have to be regulations put in place to ensure that there was no discrimination by insurance companies against the metabolic profiles of individual patients ("high metabolizers" vs. risky "low metabolizers").

== See also ==
- Pharmacogenetics
- Pharmacogenomics
- Personal genomics
- Drug development
- Metabolism
- Personalized medicine
