= M. Carmen Galan =

Spanish chemist

Maria del Carmen Galan Hurtado
- Education: University of Georgia; University of Alicante
- Scientific career
- Workplaces: Scripps Research; Massachusetts Institute of Technology; University of Bristol
- Thesis: Conformationally constrained oligosaccharides as probes for carbohydrate-protein interactions (2002)
- Website: Galan Research Group

M. Carmen Galan is a Spanish chemist and a Professor of Chemistry at the University of Bristol. Her research considers bioinspired probes for the targeting and regulation of cellular processes. She was awarded the Royal Society of Chemistry Jeremy Knowles Award in 2021.

== Early life and education ==
Galan was born in Spain. She has said that she became interested in science as a child, and fascinated by medicine whilst at high school. She earned a Licenciatura in chemistry at the University of Alicante. Galan was a doctoral researcher in the University of Georgia, where she worked with Geert-Jan Boons on carbohydrates. Her doctorate involved the use of conformationally constructed N-acetyl lactosamine derivatives. After graduating she moved to the Scripps Research Institute, working in the laboratory of Chi-Huey Wong. She spent two years at the Scripps before moving to Massachusetts Institute of Technology, where she joined the group of Sarah O'Connor and worked on natural product synthesis.

== Research and career ==
In 2006 Galan returned to the United Kingdom, where she joined the University of Bristol as a lecturer in chemistry. Her research considers carbohydrate synthesis, glycan-based nanomaterials and oligosaccharides. An understanding of glycan-based structures and their interactions is expected to help with the design and development of therapeutic tools.

Galan was named editor-in-chief of the Elsevier journal Carbohydrate Research in 2017.

== Awards and honours ==
- 2008 Wellcome Trust Value in People Award
- 2008 Royal Society Dorothy Hodgkin Fellowship
- 2011 Engineering and Physical Sciences Research Council Career Acceleration Fellowship
- 2015 European Research Council Consolidator Investigator
- 2017 Royal Society of Chemistry and Dextra Carbohydrate Chemistry Award
- 2021 Elected Fellow of the Royal Society of Chemistry
- 2021 Royal Society of Chemistry Jeremy Knowles Award
- 2025 American Chemical Society Melville L. Wolfram Award
- 2025 The Emil Fischer Carbohydrate Award

== Select publications ==
- M Carmen Galan; David Benito-Alifonso; Gregory M Watt (16 March 2011). "Carbohydrate chemistry in drug discovery". Organic and Biomolecular Chemistry. 9 (10): 3598–3610. doi:10.1039/c0ob01017k. ISSN 1477-0520. PMID 21409288. Wikidata Q37853437.
- Edward I Balmond; Diane M Coe; M. Carmen Galan; Eoghan Mcgarrigle (9 August 2012). "α-Selective organocatalytic synthesis of 2-deoxygalactosides". Angewandte Chemie International Edition. 51 (36): 9152–9155. doi:10.1002/anie.201204505. ISSN 1433-7851. PMID 22887611. Wikidata Q62603825.
- Y.Y. Zhang, M. Ghirardello, R. Williams, A. Silva-Diaz, J. Rojo, J. Ramos-Soriano, J. Voglmeir, M.C. Galan "Microfluidics-based Ionic Catch and Release Oligosaccharide Synthesis (ICROS-microflow) to expedite glycosylation chemistry" Journal of the American Chemical Society Au (JACS Au) 2024, 4, 11, 4328–4333 doi:10.1021/jacsau.4c00686
