= Natalie Ahn =

American chemist

Natalie G. Ahn
- Education: University of Washington, Seattle (B.S., 1979); University of California, Berkeley (Ph.D., 1985)
- Scientific career
- Fields: Chemistry; Biochemistry
- Workplaces: University of Colorado at Boulder (1992– ) University of Colorado Health Sciences Center, Denver (2003– ) Howard Hughes Medical Institute (1994–2014 )
- Doctoral advisor: Judith P. Klinman
- Other academic advisors: Edwin Krebs; Christoph de Haën

Natalie G. Ahn is a professor of chemistry and biochemistry at the University of Colorado at Boulder. Her research is focused on understanding the mechanisms of cell signaling, with a speciality in phosphorylation and cancers. Ahn's work uses the tools of "classical chemistry" to work on understanding the genetic code and how genetics affects life processes. She has been a professor at the University of Colorado at Boulder since 2003, where she is a distinguished professor. She was a Howard Hughes Medical Institute investigator between 1994 and 2014. In 2018, she was elected to the National Academy of Sciences and named a fellow of the American Academy of Arts and Sciences. In 2021, Ahn was named to the ASBMB's first fellowship class.

== Biography ==
=== Past education, research, and awards ===
Ahn earned her bachelor's degree in chemistry from the University of Washington, Seattle in 1979. Ahn conducted research in Lyle Jensen's lab, focusing on X-ray crystallography. Her participation in this research aided in better understanding of protein folding and visualizing of the 3-D structure of proteins by using computational techniques with X-ray crystallography. Additionally, Ahn worked as an undergraduate research assistant in David Teller's lab, which investigated protein hydrodynamics, the study of the motion of proteins relative to their aqueous environment, which they can either be suspended or dissolved within.

In 1985, she received her PhD in chemistry at the University of California, Berkeley. Here, Ahn worked with Judith Klinman, studying enzymology.

Ahn's first postdoctoral job was studying hormone receptor binding at the University of Washington with Christoph de Haen. Ahn then moved to Edwin Kreb's lab, where she began her career in signal transduction. In this lab, Ahn was "one of the first to describe MAP kinases and MAP kinase kinases." She started working at the University of Colorado Boulder in 1992. Ahn was part of the Searle Scholars Program to fund young scientists' work in 1993. She was one of eight project collaborators who won a grant from the W.M. Keck Foundation for identifying proteins in a single cell type. In 2012, she was named College Professor of Distinction at the University of Colorado. In 2014, she became part of the Subcellular Pan-Omics for Advanced Rapid Threat Assessment (SPARTA) team which is a biochemical project supported by the Defense Advanced Research Projects Agency (DARPA).

=== Current research ===
Ahn is currently working at the University of Colorado and is conducting research on cell signaling, information and proteomics, and molecular biophysics. Specific topics of her research include:

- Proteomics and Signal Transduction:
  - The lab's goal is to investigate new mechanisms that are responsible for regulation and cell signaling. In order to do this, Ahn uses mass spectrometry for protein profiling in combination with biochemical and cellular approaches to better understand a cell's response to signaling pathways.
  - In addition, Ahn investigates the internal motions of protein kinases, specifically studying their coupling protein dynamics and catalytic function.
  - Ahn studies the development of cancer by examining "signaling pathways that are activated in melanoma and influence cancer progression and cell behavior."
- Wnt5A signaling:
  - Wnt5A is responsible for controlling embryonic body axis formation and can be found at high levels in melanomas, resulting in cell invasion. Ahn and her lab discovered the "Wnt5a receptor-actin-myosin-polarity (WRAMP) structure," which aids in directional cell movements by triggering membrane retraction. Ahn was able to determine WRAMP structure using organelle proteomics.
- B-Raf signaling:
  - In half of melanoma cells, the B-Raf protein contains a missense mutation (V600E mutation), which is responsible for cell transformation, invasion, and metastasis. In order to profile phosphoproteins, Ahn uses negative precursor ion mass spectrometry to discover and count phosphopeptides. Ahn has identified numerous different proteins with this method and with this information studied how cell mechanisms used in cancer therapy were affected by protein-protein signaling.
- Proteomics Technologies:
  - In Ahn's lab, she uses multi dimensional liquid chromatography-MS/MS to identify over 8,000 proteins in each sequence of MS. Ahn's goal is to be more accurate and sensitive in these 2-D-LC-MS/MS techniques in assign proteins.
- Protein Kinase Dynamics:
  - In Ahn's lab, she uses hydrogen-exchange mass spectrometry (HX-MS) to discover and better understand protein motions on the inside of kinases, where energy fluctuations occur. Ahn's goal is to understand how the different protein dynamics are able to regulate catalytic activity in specific enzymes, most notably protein kinase. Ahn conducts research which focuses on ERK2 MAP kinases, that provide an ideal model due to their clear link between activity and protein dynamics.

=== Community service ===
Ahn was elected president of the American Society for Biochemistry and Molecular Biology (ASBMB) in the summer of 2015. She was previously a member of the council. She began attending the ASBMB annual meeting while still a PhD student at the University of California, Berkeley and gave her first public research talk at one of these meetings.

== Selected works ==
- Ahn, N. G. (1993). "The MAP kinase cascade. Discovery of a new signal transduction pathway". Molecular and cellular biochemistry. 127–128: 201–9. PMID 7935352.
