= Harold Urey =

American physical chemist (1893–1981)

Harold Urey FRS
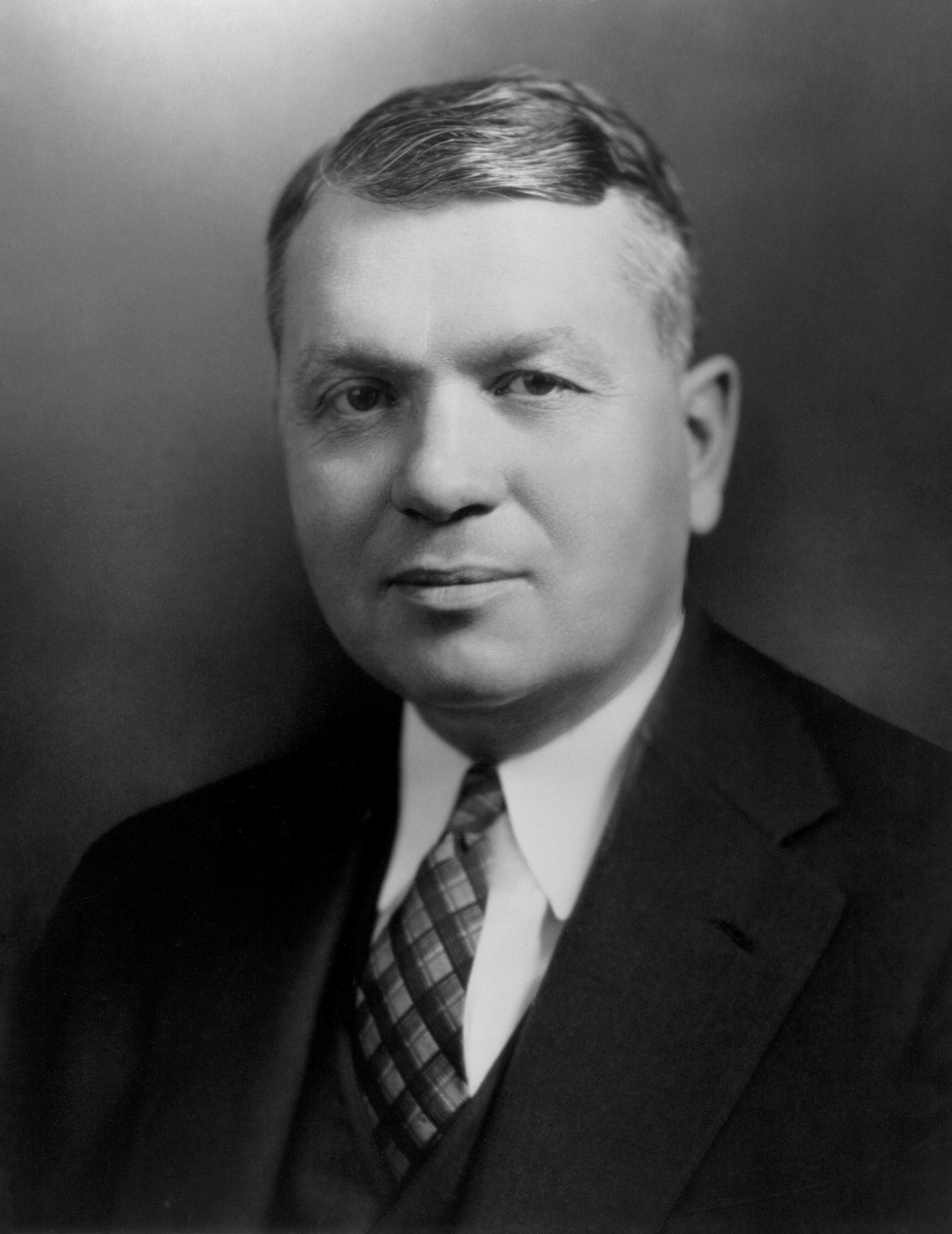
- Urey in 1934
- Born: Harold Clayton Urey; April 29, 1893; Walkerton, Indiana, U.S.
- Died: January 5, 1981 (aged 87); San Diego, California, U.S.
- Education: Earlham College: University of Montana (BS); University of California, Berkeley (PhD)
- Known for: Discovery of deuterium; Miller–Urey experiment; Carbonate–silicate cycle, aka "Urey reactions"; Urey–Bigeleisen–Mayer equation
- Children: Elizabeth
- Awards: Nobel Prize for Chemistry (1934); Willard Gibbs Award (1934); Davy Medal (1940); Franklin Medal (1943); Medal for Merit (1946); Foreign Member of the Royal Society (1947); J. Lawrence Smith Medal (1962); National Medal of Science (1964); Gold Medal of the Royal Astronomical Society (1966); Priestley Medal (1973); V. M. Goldschmidt Award (1975)
- Scientific career
- Fields: Physical chemistry
- Workplaces: University of Copenhagen; Johns Hopkins University; Columbia University; Institute for Nuclear Studies; University of Chicago; University of California, San Diego
- Doctoral advisor: Gilbert N. Lewis
- Doctoral students: Stanley Miller; Harmon Craig; Mildred Cohn; Gerald Wasserburg

Harold Clayton Urey ForMemRS (/ˈjʊəri/ YOOR-ee; April 29, 1893 – January 5, 1981) was an American physical chemist who conducted pioneering work on isotopes. He earned the 1934 Nobel Prize in Chemistry "for his discovery of heavy hydrogen." He played a significant role in the development of the atom bomb, as well as contributing to theories on the development of organic life from non-living matter.

Born in Walkerton, Indiana, Urey studied thermodynamics under Gilbert N. Lewis at the University of California, Berkeley. After he received his PhD in 1923, he was awarded a fellowship by the American-Scandinavian Foundation to study at the Niels Bohr Institute in Copenhagen. He was a research associate at Johns Hopkins University from 1924 to 1929, before becoming an associate professor of chemistry at Columbia University. In 1931, he began work with the separation of isotopes that resulted in the discovery of deuterium.

During World War II, Urey turned his knowledge of isotope separation to the problem of uranium enrichment. He headed the group located at Columbia University that developed isotope separation using gaseous diffusion. The method was successfully developed, becoming the sole method used in the early post-war period. After the war, Urey became professor of chemistry at the Institute for Nuclear Studies, and later Ryerson professor of chemistry at the University of Chicago.

Urey speculated the early terrestrial atmosphere was composed of ammonia, methane, and hydrogen. One of his Chicago graduate students was Stanley L. Miller, who showed in the Miller–Urey experiment that if such a mixture were exposed to electric sparks and water, it can interact to produce amino acids, which are among the molecular building blocks of life. Work with isotopes of oxygen led to pioneering the new field of paleoclimatic research. In 1958, he accepted a post as a professor at large at the new University of California, San Diego (UCSD), where he helped create the science faculty. He was one of the founding members of UCSD's school of chemistry created in 1960. He became increasingly interested in space science, and when Apollo 11 returned Moon rock samples from the Moon, Urey examined them at the Lunar Receiving Laboratory. Lunar astronaut Harrison Schmitt said Urey approached him as a volunteer for a one-way mission to the Moon, stating "I will go, and I don't care if I don't come back."

== Early life ==
Harold Clayton Urey was born on April 29, 1893, in Walkerton, Indiana, the son of Samuel Clayton Urey, a school teacher and a minister in the Church of the Brethren, and his wife, Cora Rebecca née Reinoehl. Of mostly German ancestry, the family name had English origins. He had a younger brother, Clarence, and a younger sister, Martha. The family moved to Glendora, California after Samuel became seriously ill with tuberculosis, hoping the climate would improve his health. When it became clear he would die, the family moved back to Indiana to live with Cora's widowed mother. Samuel died when Harold was six years old.

Urey was educated in an Amish grade school, from which he graduated at the age of 14. He then attended high school in Kendallville, Indiana. After graduating in 1911, he obtained a teacher's certificate from Earlham College, and taught in a small school house in Indiana. He later moved to Montana, where his mother was then living, and continued to teach there. Urey entered the University of Montana in Missoula in the autumn of 1914. Unlike Eastern universities of the time, the University of Montana was co-educational in both students and teachers. Urey earned a Bachelor of Science (BS) degree in zoology there in 1917.

As a result of the United States entry into World War I that same year, there was strong pressure to support the war effort. Urey was raised in the Church of the Brethren, a religious sect that opposed war. One of his professors suggested he support the wartime effort by working as a chemist. Urey took a job with the Barrett Chemical Company in Philadelphia, making TNT rather than joining the army as a soldier. After the war, he returned to the University of Montana as an instructor in chemistry.

An academic career required a doctorate, so in 1921 Urey enrolled in a PhD program at the University of California, Berkeley, where he studied thermodynamics under Gilbert N. Lewis. His initial attempt at a thesis was on the ionization of cesium vapor. He ran into difficulties, and Meghnad Saha published a better paper on the same subject. Urey then wrote his thesis on the ionization states of an ideal gas, which was subsequently published in the Astrophysical Journal. After he received his PhD in 1923, Urey was awarded a fellowship by the American-Scandinavian Foundation to study at the Niels Bohr Institute in Copenhagen, where he met Werner Heisenberg, Hans Kramers, Wolfgang Pauli, Georg von Hevesy, and John Slater. At the conclusion of his stay, he traveled to Germany, where he met Albert Einstein and James Franck.

On returning to the United States, Urey received an offer of a National Research Council fellowship to Harvard University, and also received an offer to be a research associate at Johns Hopkins University. He chose the latter. Before taking up the job, he traveled to Seattle, Washington to visit his mother. On the way, he stopped by Everett, Washington, where he knew Dr. Kate Daum, a colleague from the University of Montana. Dr. Daum introduced Urey to her sister Frieda. Urey and Frieda soon became engaged. They were married at her father's house in Lawrence, Kansas in 1926. The couple had four children: Gertrude Bessie (Elizabeth), born in 1927; Frieda Rebecca, born in 1929; Mary Alice, born in 1934; and John Clayton Urey, born in 1939.

At Johns Hopkins, Urey and Arthur Ruark wrote Atoms, Quanta and Molecules (1930), one of the first English texts on quantum mechanics and its applications to atomic and molecular systems. In 1929, Urey became an associate professor of chemistry at Columbia University, where his colleagues included Rudolph Schoenheimer, David Rittenberg, and T. I. Taylor.

== Deuterium ==
In the 1920s, William Giauque and Herrick L. Johnston discovered the stable isotopes of oxygen. Isotopes were not well understood at the time; James Chadwick would not discover the neutron until 1932. Two systems were used for classifying them based on their chemical and physical properties. The latter was determined using the mass spectrograph. Since it was known the atomic weight of oxygen was almost exactly 16 times as heavy as hydrogen, Raymond Birge and Donald Menzel hypothesized hydrogen had more than one isotope as well. Based upon the difference between the results of the two methods, they predicted only one hydrogen atom in 4,500 was of the heavy isotope.

In 1931, Urey set out to find it. Urey and George M. Murphy (1903–1968), calculated from the Balmer series that the heavy isotope should have lines blueshifted (correspondingly the light isotope redshifted) by 1.1 to 1.8 ångströms (1.1×10^{−10} to 1.8×10^{−10} metres). Urey had access to a 21-foot (6.4 m) grating spectrograph, a sensitive device recently installed at Columbia and capable of resolving the Balmer series. With a resolution of 1 Å per millimetre, the machine should have produced a difference of about 1 millimetre. However, since only one atom in 4,500 was heavy, the line on the spectrograph was very faint. Urey therefore decided to delay publishing their results until he had more conclusive evidence it was heavy hydrogen.

Urey and Murphy calculated from the Debye model the heavy isotope would have a slightly higher boiling point than the light one. By carefully warming liquid hydrogen, 5 litres of liquid hydrogen could be distilled to 1 millilitre, which would be enriched in the heavy isotope by 100 to 200 times. To obtain five litres of liquid hydrogen, they traveled to the cryogenics laboratory at the National Bureau of Standards in Washington, D.C., where they obtained the help of Ferdinand Brickwedde, whom Urey had known at Johns Hopkins.

The first sample Brickwedde sent was evaporated at 20 K (−253.2 °C; −423.7 °F) at a pressure of 1 standard atmosphere (100 kPa). To their surprise, this showed no evidence of enrichment. Brickwedde then prepared a second sample evaporated at 14 K (−259.1 °C; −434.5 °F) at a pressure of 53 mmHg (7.1 kPa). On this sample, the Balmer lines for heavy hydrogen were seven times as intense. The paper announcing the discovery of heavy hydrogen, later named deuterium, was jointly published by Urey, Murphy, and Brickwedde in 1932. Urey was awarded the Nobel Prize in Chemistry in 1934 "for his discovery of heavy hydrogen". He declined to attend the ceremony in Stockholm so he could be present at the birth of his daughter Mary Alice. He was elected to both the American Philosophical Society and the United States National Academy of Sciences the following year. Urey also received the Willard Gibbs Award in 1934, and the Davy Medal in 1940.

Working with Edward W. Washburn from the Bureau of Standards, Urey subsequently discovered the cause of the anomalous sample. Brickwedde's hydrogen had been separated from water by electrolysis, resulting in a depleted sample. Moreover, Francis William Aston had reported his calculated value for the atomic weight of hydrogen was wrong, thereby invalidating Birge and Menzel's original reasoning. The discovery of deuterium stood, however.

Urey and Washburn attempted to use electrolysis to create pure heavy water. Their technique was sound, but they were beaten to it in 1933 by Lewis, who had the resources of the University of California at his disposal. Using the Born–Oppenheimer approximation, Urey and David Rittenberg calculated the properties of gases containing hydrogen and deuterium. They extended this to enriching compounds of carbon, nitrogen, and oxygen. These could be used as tracers in biochemistry, resulting in a whole new way of examining chemical reactions. He founded the Journal of Chemical Physics in 1932, and was its first editor, serving in that capacity until 1940.

At Columbia, Urey chaired the University Federation for Democracy and Intellectual Freedom. He supported Atlanticist Clarence Streit's proposal for a federal union of the world's major democracies, and the republican cause during the Spanish Civil War. He was an early opponent of German Nazism and assisted refugee scientists, including Enrico Fermi, by helping them find work in the United States, and to adjust to life in a new country.

== Manhattan Project ==
By the time World War II broke out in Europe in 1939, Urey was recognized as a world expert on isotope separation. Thus far, separation had involved only the light elements. In 1939 and 1940, Urey published two papers on the separation of heavier isotopes in which he proposed centrifugal separation. This assumed great importance due to Niels Bohr speculating uranium 235 was fissile. Because it was considered "very doubtful whether a chain reaction can be established without separating 235 from the rest of the uranium," Urey began intensive studies of how uranium enrichment might be achieved. Apart from centrifugal separation, George Kistiakowsky suggested gaseous diffusion might be a possible method. A third possibility was thermal diffusion. Urey coordinated all isotope separation research efforts, including the effort to produce heavy water, which could be used as a neutron moderator in nuclear reactors.

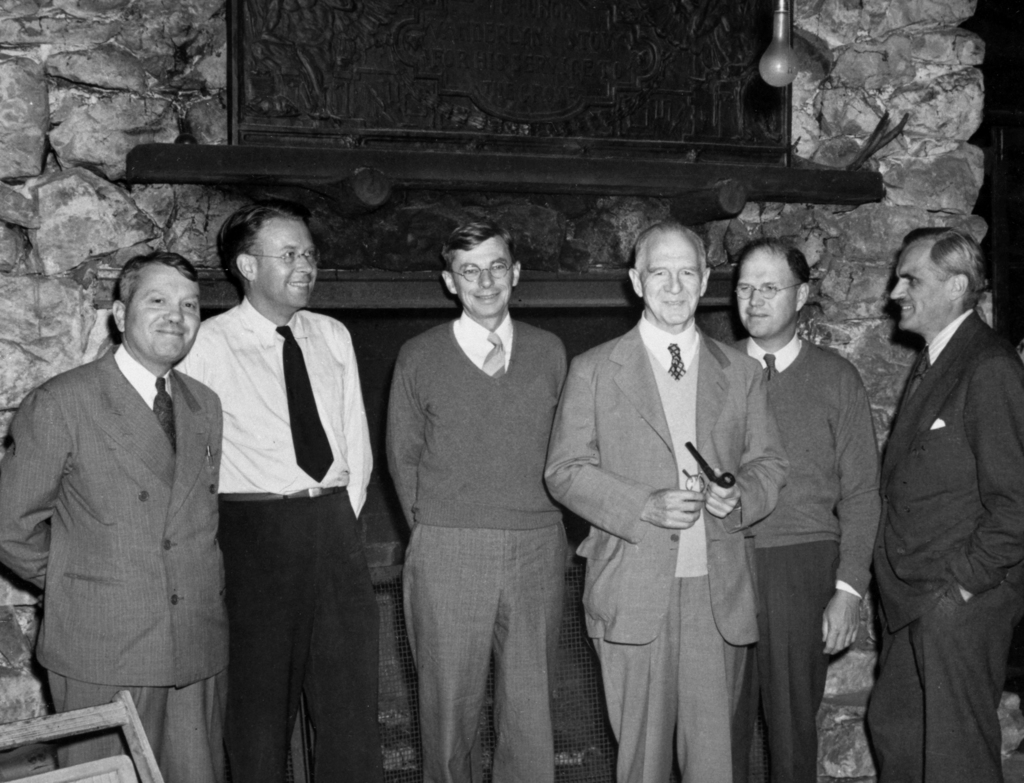
The S-1 Executive Committee at Bohemian Grove, September 13, 1942. From left to right are Urey, Ernest O. Lawrence, James B. Conant, Lyman J. Briggs, Eger V. Murphree, and Arthur H. Compton.

In May 1941, Urey was appointed to the Committee on Uranium, which oversaw the uranium project as part of the National Defense Research Committee (NDRC). In 1941, Urey and George B. Pegram led a diplomatic mission to England to establish co-operation on development of the atomic bomb. The British were optimistic about gaseous diffusion, but it was clear both gaseous and centrifugal methods faced formidable technical obstacles. In May 1943, as the Manhattan Project gained momentum, Urey became head of the wartime Substitute Alloy Materials Laboratories (SAM Laboratories) at Columbia. SAM was responsible for the heavy water and all the isotope enrichment processes except Ernest Lawrence's electromagnetic process.

Early reports on the centrifugal method indicated it was not as efficient as predicted. Urey suggested that a more efficient but technically more complicated countercurrent system be used instead of the previous flow-through method. By November 1941, technical obstacles seemed formidable enough for the process to be abandoned. Countercurrent centrifuges were developed after the war, and today are the favored method in many countries.

The gaseous diffusion process remained more encouraging, although it too had technical obstacles to overcome. By the end of 1943, Urey had over 700 people working for him on gaseous diffusion. The process involved hundreds of cascades, in which corrosive uranium hexafluoride diffused through gaseous barriers, becoming progressively more enriched at every stage. A major problem was finding proper seals for the pumps, but by far the greatest difficulty lay in constructing an appropriate diffusion barrier. Construction of the huge K-25 gaseous diffusion plant was well under way before a suitable barrier became available in quantity in 1944. As a backup, Urey championed thermal diffusion.

Worn out by the effort, Urey left the project in February 1945, handing over his responsibilities to Ray Crist. The K-25 plant commenced operation in March 1945, and as the bugs were worked out, the plant operated with remarkable efficiency and economy. For a time, uranium was fed into the S50 liquid thermal diffusion plant, then the K-25 gaseous plant, and finally the Y-12 electromagnetic separation plant; but soon after the war ended the thermal and electromagnetic separation plants were closed down, and separation was performed by K-25 alone. Along with its twin K-27, constructed in 1946, it became the principal isotope separation plant in the early post-war period. For his work on the Manhattan Project, Urey was awarded the Medal for Merit by the Project director, Major General Leslie R. Groves, Jr.

== Post-war years ==
After the war, Urey became professor of chemistry at the Institute for Nuclear Studies at the University of Chicago, and then became Ryerson professor of chemistry there in 1952. He did not continue his pre-war research with isotopes. However, applying the knowledge gained with hydrogen to oxygen, he realized the fractionation between carbonate and water for oxygen-18 and oxygen-16 would decrease by a factor of 1.04 between 0 and 25 °C (32 and 77 °F). The ratio of the isotopes could then be used to determine average temperatures, assuming the measurement equipment was sufficiently sensitive. The team included his colleague Ralph Buchsbaum. Examination of a 100-million-year-old belemnite then indicated the summer and winter temperatures it had lived through over a period of four years. For this pioneering paleoclimatic research, Urey was awarded the Arthur L. Day Medal by the Geological Society of America, and the V. M. Goldschmidt Award of the Geochemical Society. At the University of Chicago, Urey contributed to the Urey–Bigeleisen–Mayer equation, a model of stable isotope fractionation.

Miller–Urey experiment

Urey actively campaigned against the 1946 May-Johnson bill because he feared it would lead to military control of nuclear energy, but supported and fought for the McMahon bill that replaced it, and ultimately created the Atomic Energy Commission. Urey's commitment to the ideal of world government dated from before the war, but the possibility of nuclear war made it only more urgent in his mind. He went on lecture tours against war, and became involved in Congressional debates regarding nuclear issues. He argued publicly on behalf of Ethel and Julius Rosenberg, and was called before the House Committee on Un-American Activities.

== Cosmochemistry and the Miller–Urey experiment ==
In later life, Urey helped develop the field of cosmochemistry. His work on oxygen-18 led him to developed theories about the abundance of the chemical elements on Earth, and of their abundance and evolution in the stars. Urey summarized his work in The Planets: Their Origin and Development (1952). Urey speculated the early terrestrial atmosphere was rich in ammonia, methane, hydrogen and water, with their relative abundances reflecting those in interstellar space. One of his Chicago graduate students, Stanley L. Miller, used this theory as the basis for what became known as the Miller–Urey experiment. Miller demonstrated that if such a mixture is exposed to electric sparks and water, it can interact to produce amino acids, commonly considered the building blocks of life.

Urey also researched the isotopic abundance of cosmic bodies, particularly the contribution of radioisotopes to internal heating. In tribute to his contributions, scientists refer to the ratio of a planet's internal heat generation to surface heat flux as the Urey ratio. Urey spent a year in the United Kingdom as a visiting professor at Oxford University in 1956 and 1957. In 1958, he reached the University of Chicago's retirement age of 65, but he accepted a post as a professor at large at the new University of California, San Diego (UCSD), and moved to La Jolla, California. He was subsequently made a professor emeritus there from 1970 to 1981. Urey helped build up the science faculty there. He was one of the founding members of UCSD's school of chemistry, which was created in 1960, along with Stanley Miller, Hans Suess, and Jim Arnold.

In the late 1950s and early 1960s, space science became a topic of research in the wake of the launch of Sputnik 1. Urey helped persuade NASA to make uncrewed probes to the Moon a priority. When Apollo 11 returned Moon rock samples from the Moon, Urey examined them at the Lunar Receiving Laboratory. The samples supported Urey's contention that the Moon and the Earth shared a common origin. While at UCSD, Urey published 105 scientific papers, 47 of them about lunar topics. When asked why he continued to work so hard, he joked, "Well, you know I'm not on tenure anymore."

== Death and legacy ==
Urey enjoyed gardening and raising cattleya, cymbidium and other orchids. He died at La Jolla, California on January 5, 1981, and is buried at the Fairfield Cemetery in DeKalb County, Indiana.

Apart from his Nobel Prize, he also won the Franklin Medal in 1943, the J. Lawrence Smith Medal in 1962, the Gold Medal of the Royal Astronomical Society in 1966, the Golden Plate Award of the American Academy of Achievement in 1966, and the Priestley Medal of the American Chemical Society in 1973. In 1964 he received the National Medal of Science. He became a Fellow of the Royal Society in 1947. Named after him are lunar impact crater Urey, asteroid 4716 Urey, and the H. C. Urey Prize, awarded for achievement in planetary sciences by the American Astronomical Society. The Harold C. Urey Middle School in Walkerton, Indiana, is also named for him, as is Urey Hall, the chemistry building at Revelle College, UCSD, in La Jolla, and the Harold C. Urey Lecture Hall at the University of Montana. UCSD has also established a Harold C. Urey chair whose first holder was James Arnold.

Urey's daughter Elizabeth Baranger also became a notable physicist.

== See also ==
- Carbonate–silicate cycle
