= School of Chemistry, University of Edinburgh =

Coordinates: 55.924°N 3.176°W

School of Chemistry
- Parent institution: University of Edinburgh College of Science and Engineering
- Head of School: Jason B. Love
- Location: Edinburgh, United Kingdom
- Website: www.chem.ed.ac.uk/staff

The School of Chemistry is an academic department within the College of Science and Engineering at the University of Edinburgh in Scotland.

In the 2008 Research Assessment Exercise (RAE), the school was ranked sixth in the UK.

== History and alumni ==
The teaching of Chemistry at Edinburgh began in 1713 when James Crawford was appointed to the 'Chair of Physik and Chymistry' (where 'physik' = natural science/art of medicine). The department has occupied many sites in its history, from a house at the top of Robertson's Close in the city centre, to purpose-built facilities in the central campus at Old College through to its current location at King's Buildings. Each move has brought with it expansions in size and status until the department occupied the position it does now, as one of the world's leading Chemistry teaching and research establishments.

The department also hosts the oldest student-run Chemistry society in the world which was created in 1785 and is still active today.

Today the department carries on the traditions of Chemistry at Edinburgh both in teaching and research. The collaborative research School formed with St Andrews University Chemistry department to form EaStCHEM has strengthened research in Scotland in the chemical sciences.

Alumni and former staff include:

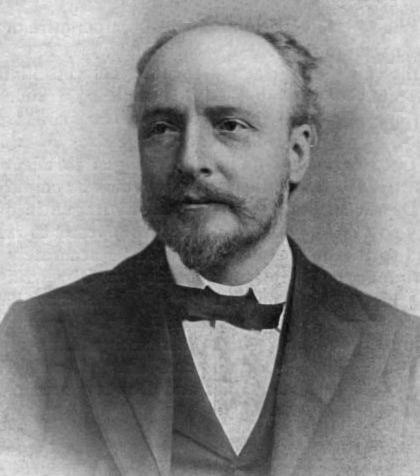
James Dewar

- Thomas Anderson, discoverer of pyridine
- Joseph Black, discoverer of carbon dioxide, latent heat and specific heat
- Perdita Barran, Professor in the School of Chemistry, University of Manchester
- Neil Campbell, chemist and amateur athlete
- Archibald Scott Couper, proposed an early theory of chemical structure and bonding
- John Davy, discoverer of phosgene
- James Dewar, inventor of the Dewar flask
- Narayan Hosmane, cancer researcher, BNCT
- David Leigh, Forbes Chair of Organic Chemistry at the University of Edinburgh from 2001 to 2012, Feynman Prize in Nanotechnology winner in 2007
- Christina Miller, synthesized phosphorus trioxide
- Dai Rees, CEO of the Medical Research Council from 1987 to 1996
- Prafulla Chandra Roy, distinguished chemist and founder of Bengal Chemicals & Pharmaceuticals
- Daniel Rutherford, discovered nitrogen while he was studying at the University of Edinburgh in 1772
- James Fraser Stoddart, supramolecular chemist
- Lesley Yellowlees CBE, first female president of the Royal Society of Chemistry, Vice-President of the University of Edinburgh

== Organisation ==
The school has a research staff of approximately 120 individuals, and an academic staff of over 40. Current annual enrollment includes around 200 research students, and 450 taught postgraduate and undergraduate students.

EaStCHEM is the joint research school in chemistry between the Universities of Edinburgh and St Andrews. It has eight research groupings: Chemical Biology; Synthesis; Materials; Structural Chemistry; Chemical Physics; Biophysical Chemistry; Inorganic Chemistry; and Catalysis.

In the Research Assessment Exercise (RAE) 2008, the most in-depth analysis of research outputs for seven years, EaStCHEM, submitted 73% of all world leading outputs (4*) in Scotland and 12% of world leading outputs in all of the UK. From 31 submissions EastChem was the largest in UK Chemistry. EaStCHEM comes joint 4th in the Grade Point Average (GPA) metric, and first when staff numbers are factored in (the power ranking).

=== Research themes ===
The School has four major research themes as part of EaStCHEM:

The Chemistry/Biology Interface area is broad, with particular strengths in the areas of protein structure and function, mechanistic enzymology, proteomics, biologically targeted synthesis, the application of high throughput and combinatorial approaches and biophysical chemistry, which focuses on the development and application of physicochemical techniques to biological systems.

Chemical Physics/Physical Chemistry is the fundamental study of molecular properties and processes. Areas of expertise include probing molecular structure in the gas phase, clusters and nanoparticles, the development and application of physicochemical techniques such as mass spectrometry to molecular systems and the EaStCHEM surface science group, who study complex molecules on surfaces, probing the structure property-relationships employed in heterogeneous catalysis. A major feature is In Silico Scotland, a world class research computing facility.

Molecular Synthesis encompasses the synthesis and characterisation at ambient and extreme conditions of organic and inorganic compounds, including those with application in homogeneous catalysis, nanotechnology, supramolecular chemistry, drug discovery and ligand design. The development of innovative synthetic and characterisation methodologies (particularly in structural chemistry) is a key feature.

The Materials Chemistry group is one of the largest materials chemistry groups in the UK. Areas of strength include the design, synthesis and characterisation of strongly correlated electronic materials, battery and fuel cell materials and devices, porous solids, materials at extreme pressures and temperatures, polymer microarray technologies and technique development for materials and nanomaterials analysis.

== Senior academic staff ==
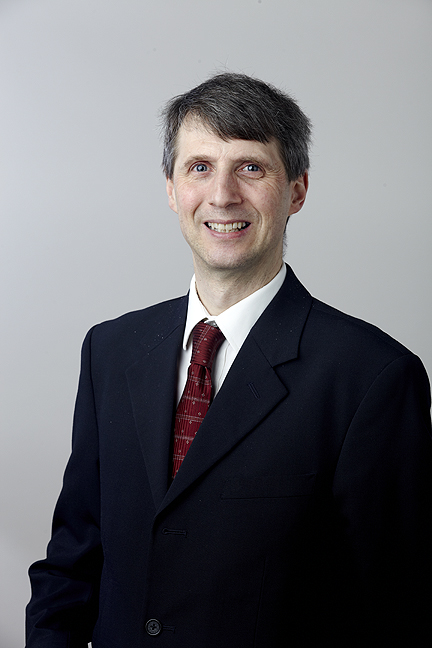
Paul Attfield FRS FRSE FRSC

As of 2024 senior academic staff (full professors) in the school include:

- Paul Attfield FRS FRSE FRSC
- Euan K. Brechin FRSE
- Eleanor Campbell FRS FRSC FInstP
- Dominic Campopiano
- Alison Hulme
- Anita C. Jones
- Guy Lloyd-Jones FRS FRSE
- Neil McKeown FRSE
- Colin R. Pulham
- Carole A. Morrison
- Jason Love
- Paul N. Barlow
- Scott L. Cockroft
- Michael Ingleson
- Simon Parsons
- Neil Robertson
- Dusan Uhrin
- Andy Mount

== See also ==
- Scottish Instrumentation and Research Centre for Advanced Mass Spectrometry SIRCAMS
