= Interdisciplinary Prizes (RSC) =

The Interdisciplinary Prizes of the Royal Society of Chemistry recognize work at the interface between chemistry and other disciplines. Up to three prizes are awarded annually: Each winner receives £5000 and a medal, and completes a UK lecture tour.

== Winners ==
2024	Tim Bugg, Judith Driscoll, Sébastien Perrier
2023	Serena Cussen, Nora de Leeuw, Nicholas Long
2022	Michael George, Jason Micklefield, Nguyen T. K. Thanh
2021	Andrew Cooper, Eleanor Schofield
2020	Chris Abell, Iain McCulloch, Emma Raven
2019	Mark Bradley, Christopher Schofield, Nigel Scrutton
2018	Leroy Cronin, Judy Hirst, Barrie Wilkinson
2017	Gregory L. Challis, Melinda Duer, Fiona Meldrum
2016	Jörg Feldmann, Peter Hore, Dek Woolfson
2015	Elaine Holmes, Sarah L. Price, Anthony Watts
2014	Steven Armes, Sabine Flitsch, Richard D. Pancost
2013	James Barber, Jane Clarke
2012	Hagan Bayley
2011	Carol V. Robinson
2010	Alexei Kornyshev, Barry V. L. Potter
2009	Tom Brown, Bonnie Ann Wallace
2008	no award
2007	David Klenerman, Jeremy Nicholson
2006	John Goodby, David Lilley
2005	Fraser Armstrong, Steven M. Howdle, Raymond White
2004	Douglas Kell, David Leigh
2003	Richard Evershed, Douglas W. Young
2002	Peter Bruce, Stephen Neidle
2001	Stephen K. Chapman, James Feast
2000	Martyn Poliakoff, Andrew J. Thomson
1999	Chris Dobson, Stephen Mann, Christopher Viney
1998	Richard Catlow, Christopher Evans
1997	Peter J. Sarre, Ruth Duncan
1996	Peter Gregory
1995	David Parker
1994	James Rankin Maxwell
1993	J. John Holbrook
1992	Martin R. Bryce, Dennis Chapman
1991	Richard Friend, Malcolm Stevens
1990	John A. Pyle
1989	Laurie J. King
1988	Brian J. Briscoe
1987	Laurance D. Hall, John E. Harris
1986	Allen Hill, Michael Jarman

== See also ==
- List of chemistry awards
