= Perdita =

Perdita (Italian for "loss", from Latin for "lost woman"), may refer to:

== People ==
- Perdita (given name), the history and usage of the name
- Perdita Barran, English chemist
- Perdita Buchan (born 1940), Anglo-American author
- Perdita Felicien (born 1980), Canadian track athlete
- Perdita Huston (1936–2001), American women's rights activist
- Perdita Stevens (born 1966), British mathematician and computer scientist
- Perdita Weeks (born 1985), British actress

== Science ==
- Perdita, a genus of North American native bees
- Perdita (moon), a minor satellite of the planet Uranus

== Fiction ==
- Perdita (The Winter's Tale), the heroine of Shakespeare's play The Winter's Tale
- Perdita Boyte, a character from the 1936 novel And Berry Came Too by Dornford Yates
- Perdita Durango, a character from Perdita Durango and Wild at Heart by Barry Gifford.
- Perdita Hyde-Sinclair, a character from the British soap opera Emmerdale
- Perdita Macleod, a character in the novel Polo (1991) by Jilly Cooper
- Perdita Nitt, aka Agnes Nitt, a character in the Witches subset of Terry Pratchett's Discworld series
- Perdita Willoughby-Lloyd, a minor character from the TV series The Haunting of Bly Manor
- Queen Perdita of Vlatava, a character of the animated superhero series Young Justice
- Perdita, a female Dalmatian dog in The Hundred and One Dalmatians, a 1956 children's novel by Dodie Smith, and the media franchise based on the novel; see 101 Dalmatians (disambiguation)
- The Free Ship Perdita, a sky-sailing ship in the 1999 novel Stardust (1999) by Neil Gaiman

== Other ==
- Perdita (horse) (foaled 1881), English thoroughbred
