= Perdita (given name) =

Female given name

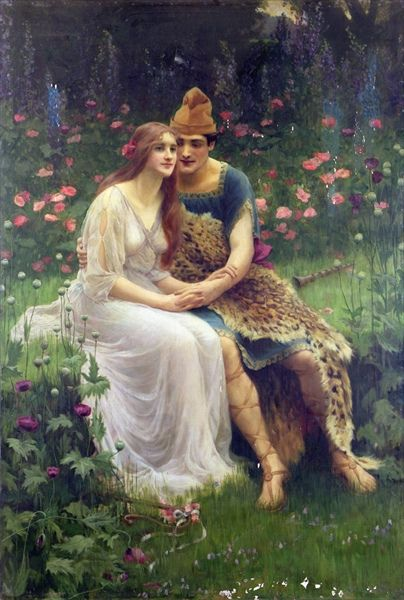
- Florizel and Perdita from William Shakespeare's The Winter's Tale by Mary F Raphael, ca. 1901.
- Gender: Feminine
- Language: Latin

Origin
- Meaning: Lost

Perdita is a feminine given name derived from perditus, meaning "lost". It was used by William Shakespeare for an abandoned princess, the heroine of his 1610 play The Winter's Tale, and for a canine heroine of Dodie Smith's 1956 book The Hundred and One Dalmatians and the Walt Disney Pictures 1961 film adaptation of the book, One Hundred and One Dalmatians.

== Women ==
- Perdita Barran, English chemist
- Perdita Buchan (born 1940), Anglo-American author
- Perdita Felicien (born 1980), Canadian track athlete
- Perdita Huston (1936–2001), American women's rights activist
- Perdita Stevens (born 1966), British mathematician and computer scientist
- Perdita Weeks (born 1985), British actress

== Fiction ==
- Perdita (The Winter's Tale), the heroine of Shakespeare's play The Winter's Tale
- Perdita Boyte, a character from the 1936 novel And Berry Came Too by Dornford Yates
- Perdita Halley Reisden, a character in Sarah Smith's historical mystery seriesThe Vanished Child, The Knowledge of Water, Citizen of the Country and Crimes and Survivors
- Perdita Hyde-Sinclair, a character from the British soap opera Emmerdale
- Perdita MacLeod, a character from the novel Polo by Jilly Cooper and the series Rivals
- Perdita Nitt, aka Agnes Nitt, a character in the Witches subset of Terry Pratchett's Discworld series
- Perdita Willoughby-Lloyd, a minor character from the TV series The Haunting of Bly Manor
- Queen Perdita of Vlatava, a character of the animated superhero series Young Justice
- Perdita, a female Dalmatian dog in The Hundred and One Dalmatians, a 1956 children's novel by Dodie Smith, and the media franchise based on the novel; see 101 Dalmatians (disambiguation)
- The Free Ship Perdita, a sky-sailing ship in the 1999 novel Stardust (1999) by Neil Gaiman
- Perdita Verney, character in The Last Man by Mary Wollstonecraft Shelley.
