= Jenny Slaughter =

British chemist

- Born: Jennifer Louise Slaughter
- Education: University of East Anglia (BSc); Bristol University (PhD)
- Known for: Laboratory Chemical Education; Science Communication; Teaching and Scholarship
- Awards: Teaching Excellence Award (2019); Pfizer Organic Poster Prize (2007)
- Scientific career
- Fields: Chemistry education Academic Writing
- Workplaces: The University of Manchester
- Thesis: Mechanistic studies of asymmetric homoallylic vinylcyclopropanation (2007)
- Doctoral advisor: Prof. Guy Lloyd-Jones

Jennifer Louise Slaughter is a British chemist and a Senior Lecturer in the Department of Chemistry at the University of Manchester. Her research is based on chemistry education and academic writing, specifically on laboratory chemical education, science communication, teaching and scholarship.

== Education ==
Slaughter completed her Bachelor of Science degree at University of East Anglia in 2000. Upon graduation, she read her Doctor of Philosophy degree at Bristol University, supervised by Prof. Guy Lloyd-Jones, on Mechanistic studies of asymmetric homoallylic vinylcyclopropanation and obtained her PhD in 2007.

== Research and career ==
Slaughter completed her postdoctoral research at Bristol University under the supervision of Prof. Kevin Booker-Milburn. Her work focused on Palladium chemistry. In 2009, she joined Bristol University as a teaching laboratory fellow. In 2015, Slaughter joined the Department of Chemistry at the University of Manchester as a Lecturer in chemistry and was later promoted to the position of Senior Lecturer. Slaughter is the current head of teaching and scholarship and the teaching laboratory coordinator in the Department of Chemistry at the University of Manchester.

Slaughter's research is generally based on chemistry education and academic writing, specifically on laboratory chemical education, science communication, teaching and scholarship. She is also a senior fellow in Higher Education Academy and has participated in several outreach activities, including Salters' Institute Festival of Chemistry, Manchester (2019) in collaboration with the Royal Society of Chemistry. Slaughter has participated in events organized by the Royal Society of Chemistry on promoting teaching in chemistry. In 2009, Slaughter headed the organisation of the School of Chemistry's Inaugural Postdoctoral Research Symposium. Slaughter also participated in the Teaching and Learning Conference (2019) where she discussed the professional development opportunities for general teaching assistants and the barriers and challenges they face in engaging with these opportunities.

=== Notable work ===
In her position as the teaching laboratory coordinator in the Department of Chemistry at the University of Manchester, Slaughter implemented the use of Findensers which require only airflow to sustain reflux as opposed to traditional wasteful water based condensers. This change was based on undergraduate feedback within the laboratory.

In collaboration with Lynne Bianchi, Slaughter contributed to the book, Teaching in Chemistry in Higher Education for which they co-authored a chapter on Student-led research groups for supporting educational research projects in which they discussed setting up an educational research group to support students conducting educational research projects in chemistry degrees.

Slaughter, in collaboration with Natalie Fey, also started the Picture It… Chemistry Blog in 2013 at Bristol University as a means of communicating science to general audiences with limited scientific knowledge. The blog became one of the most successful in the chemistry department at Bristol University. It includes posts on various scientific topics contributed by a range of individuals, including students and lecturers.

=== Awards and nominations ===
- Teaching Excellence Award (2019)
- Pfizer Organic Poster Prize (2007)
