= Samuel Hay =

Samuel Hay may refer to:

- Samuel Ross Hay (1865–1944), American bishop of the Methodist Episcopal Church, South
- Samuel M. Hay (1825–1906), American businessman and Wisconsin politician

== See also ==
- Sam Hay (disambiguation)
