= Melinda Duer =

British biomedical chemist

Melinda Duer FRSC
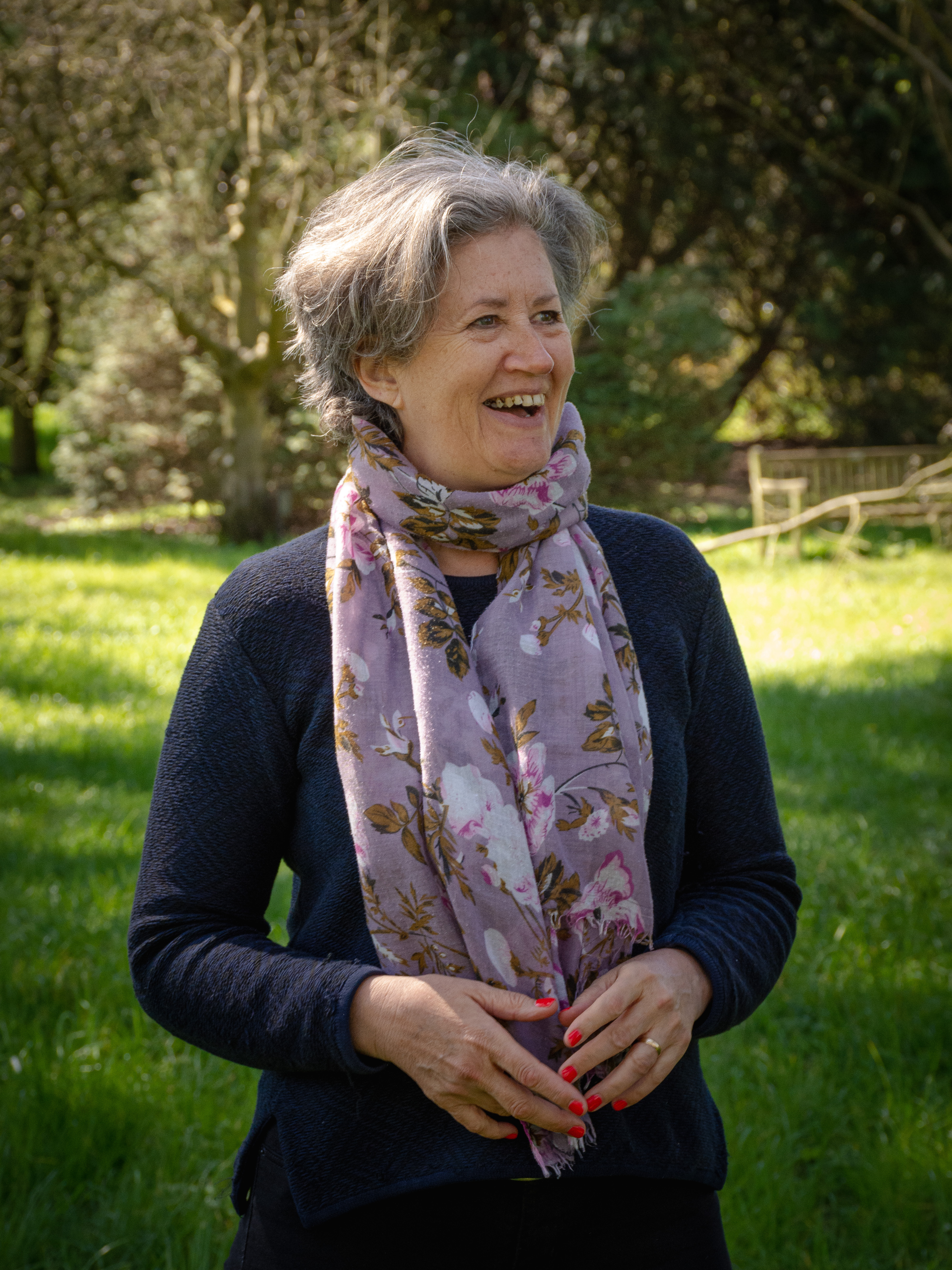
- Melinda Duer at Cambridge, 2021
- Born: Melinda J. Duer; 1 October 1963 (age 62)
- Education: University of Cambridge (BA, MA, PhD)
- Awards: Interdisciplinary Prize (2017); Suffrage Science award (2019)
- Scientific career
- Fields: Biological chemistry and biomedical Chemistry
- Institutions: University of Cambridge; Robinson College, Cambridge
- Thesis: The parametric probes of ligand field theory (1988)
- Doctoral advisor: Malcolm Gerloch
- Website: Duer Lab; Robinson College webpage

Melinda Jane Duer FRSC is Professor of Biological and Biomedical Chemistry in the Department of Chemistry at the University of Cambridge, and was the first woman to be appointed to an academic position in the department. Her research investigates changes in molecular structure of the extracellular matrix in tissues in disease and during ageing. She served as Deputy Warden of Robinson College, Cambridge from 2016 to 2021. She is an editorial board member of the Journal of Magnetic Resonance.

== Early life and education ==
Duer attended Sir James Smith's School, a comprehensive school at Camelford, North Cornwall. She enjoyed science there and was encouraged by her chemistry teacher to study natural sciences at Emmanuel College, Cambridge, where she specialized in chemistry. She was the first member of her family to attend higher education. Duer went on to complete her PhD in 1988 in theoretical chemistry with Malcolm Gerloch, in which she investigated ligand field theory.

== Research and career ==
During the course of her PhD research, Duer developed an interest in nuclear magnetic resonance spectroscopy (NMR) while chatting with Lynn Gladden who frequently worked on the spectrometer in the room opposite Duer's office at the time. Towards the end of her PhD, Duer proposed using solid-state NMR to investigate organometallic catalytic species in response to an advertised temporary lectureship in the department. Thus, she became the first woman to be appointed to a lectureship in the Department of Chemistry at the University of Cambridge in 1988. In 1990, she was awarded a Royal Society University Research Fellowship.

Duer begun her research in solid-state NMR by investigating molecular mobility in porous materials in collaboration with Gladden who has moved to the Department of Chemical Engineering. She went on to investigate molecular mobility more broadly, in polymers and other solids. With a theoretical chemistry background and through discussions with Malcolm Levitt and others, Duer also developed solid-state NMR experiments to probe anisotropic interactions, such as quadrupolar interactions and chemical shift anisotropy. In 2001 and 2004, she published two books on solid-state NMR, targeted at graduate students.

In early 2000s, Duer pioneered the use of solid-state NMR to investigate biological tissues, including keratin and bones, frequently obtained from horses due to her interest in horse riding. Her previous research on liquid crystal phases of polymers led her to wonder whether similar phases could form in keratin.

Duer has extensively investigated the extracellular matrix, the component of biological tissues that simultaneously serves as the communication system between cells and provides a scaffold to support them. She is particularly interested in the molecular mechanisms that underpin the functions of the extracellular matrix. By understanding the structure-property relationships of biological tissue, Duer works to unravel the processes that give rise to collagenous tissue and mineralisation.

Duer has investigated the calcification of blood vessels that occurs when people age. She proposed that the hardening of arteries caused by the build-up of calcium may be triggered by polymeric adenosine diphosphate ribose (PAR), a molecule that is produced when the DNA inside cells is damaged. One of her graduate students launched a spin-out company, Cycle Pharmaceuticals, which provides personalised treatment to patients with vascular diseases. She was promoted to Professor in 2015.

Duer was awarded the Royal Society of Chemistry Interdisciplinary Prize in 2017, and the Suffrage Science award in 2019.

=== Commercial ventures ===
Apart from licensing novel treatment for treating vascular disease to Cycle Pharmaceuticals, Duer is a co-founder of Cambridge Oncology Ltd.

=== Mentoring and international development ===
Duer is part of the Strategic Advisory Group of the Cambridge-Africa Programme, an initiative by the University of Cambridge to strengthen research capacity with African universities and research institutions. In this role, Duer mentors African academics such as Dr Mercy Badu of Kwame Nkrumah University of Science and Technology.

As a previous holder of the Suffrage Science award, Duer nominated Dr Mary Anti Chama of the University of Ghana for the same award in 2021.

== Selected publications ==
=== Journal articles ===
- Wing Ying Chow; Rakesh Rajan; Karin H Muller; et al. (1 May 2014). "NMR spectroscopy of native and in vitro tissues implicates polyADP ribose in biomineralization". Science. 344 (6185): 742–746. doi:10.1126/SCIENCE.1248167. ISSN 0036-8075. PMID 24833391. Wikidata Q46284845.
- Karin H Müller; Robert Hayward; Rakesh Rajan; et al. (1 June 2019). "Poly(ADP-Ribose) Links the DNA Damage Response and Biomineralization". Cell Reports. 27 (11): 3124-3138.e13. doi:10.1016/J.CELREP.2019.05.038. ISSN 2211-1247. PMC 6581741. PMID 31189100. Wikidata Q64929814.
- Erika Davies; Karin H Müller; Wai Ching Wong; Chris J Pickard; David G Reid; Jeremy N Skepper; Melinda J Duer (24 March 2014). "Citrate bridges between mineral platelets in bone". Proceedings of the National Academy of Sciences of the United States of America. 111 (14): E1354-63. Bibcode:2014PNAS..111E1354D. doi:10.1073/PNAS.1315080111. ISSN 0027-8424. PMC 3986129. PMID 24706850. Wikidata Q30794955.
- Sneha Bansode; Uliana Bashtanova; Rui Li; et al. (25 February 2020). "Glycation changes molecular organization and charge distribution in type I collagen fibrils". Scientific Reports. 10 (1): 3397. doi:10.1038/S41598-020-60250-9. ISSN 2045-2322. PMC 7042214. PMID 32099005. Wikidata Q89882361.
- Wing Ying Chow; Christopher J. Forman; Dominique Bihan; et al. (14 September 2018). "Proline provides site-specific flexibility for in vivo collagen". Scientific Reports. 8 (1): 13809. doi:10.1038/S41598-018-31937-X. ISSN 2045-2322. PMC 6138679. PMID 30218106. Wikidata Q58177359.
- Wing Ying Chow; Rui Li; Ieva Goldberga; et al. (9 October 2018). "Essential but sparse collagen hydroxylysyl post-translational modifications detected by DNP NMR". ChemComm. doi:10.1039/C8CC04960B. ISSN 1364-548X. PMID 30299444. Wikidata Q57288059.
- R Li; R Rajan; W C V Wong; et al. (1 December 2017). "In situ characterization of advanced glycation end products (AGEs) in collagen and model extracellular matrix by solid state NMR". ChemComm. 53 (100): 13316–13319. doi:10.1039/C7CC06624D. ISSN 1364-548X. PMC 5774432. PMID 29192920. Wikidata Q47343933.
- Melinda J Duer; Tomislav Friscić; Diane Proudfoot; David G Reid; Michael Schoppet; Catherine M Shanahan; Jeremy N Skepper; Erica R Wise (14 August 2008). "Mineral surface in calcified plaque is like that of bone: further evidence for regulated mineralization". Arteriosclerosis, Thrombosis, and Vascular Biology. 28 (11): 2030–2034. doi:10.1161/ATVBAHA.108.172387. ISSN 1079-5642. PMID 18703777. Wikidata Q46276752.
- "The Organic−Mineral Interface in Bone Is Predominantly Polysaccharide". Chemistry of Materials. 19: 5055–5057. 2007. doi:10.1021/CM702054C. ISSN 0897-4756. Wikidata Q65589175.
- Wing Ying Chow; Dominique Bihan; Christopher J. Forman; David A Slatter; David G Reid; David J Wales; Richard W Farndale; Melinda J Duer (29 July 2015). "Hydroxyproline Ring Pucker Causes Frustration of Helix Parameters in the Collagen Triple Helix". Scientific Reports. 5 12556. doi:10.1038/SREP12556. ISSN 2045-2322. PMC 4518226. PMID 26220399. Wikidata Q41085215.

=== Books ===
- Duer, Melinda J. (2004). Introduction to solid-state NMR spectroscopy. Oxford, UK: Blackwell. ISBN 1-4051-0914-9. OCLC 53178681.
- Duer, Melinda J., ed. (2002). Solid-state NMR spectroscopy: principles and applications. Malden, MA: Blackwell Science. ISBN 978-0-470-99939-4. OCLC 184983770.
- Harris, Robin K.; Wasylishen, Roderick E.; Duer, Melinda J., eds. (2009). NMR crystallography. Chichester, U.K.: Wiley. ISBN 978-0-470-69961-4. OCLC 426813648.

== Personal life ==
Duer used to be an equestrian, and has said that her interest in biological chemistry started with studying keratin in horses hooves and understanding leg fractures in one of her rescue horses. Her other interests include cycling and competing in triathlons.
