= Nicholas Long (chemist) =

British inorganic chemist (born 1965)

Nicholas Long FRSC
- Born: 11 June 1965 (age 61); Bristol, England
- Education: Durham University; University of Exeter
- Scientific career
- Fields: Inorganic chemistry Organometallic chemistry
- Workplaces: Imperial College London
- Website: https://profiles.imperial.ac.uk/n.long

Nicholas J. Long (born 11 June 1965), also known as Nick Long, is a British chemist and the Sir Edward Frankland BP Professor of Inorganic Chemistry at Imperial College London.

His research focuses on coordination and organometallic chemistry, with applications in catalysis, materials science and molecular imaging.

== Early life and education ==
Long was born in Bristol on 11 June 1965. He studied chemistry at Durham University, where he was a member of Hatfield College, graduating with a first-class degree in 1986.

He subsequently completed a PhD in organometallic chemistry in 1989 at the University of Exeter under Edward Abel and Tony Osborne.

== Career and research ==
After completing his doctorate, Long moved to the University of Cambridge, where he was Adrian Research Fellow at Darwin College and a temporary lecturer in inorganic chemistry. He joined Imperial College London as a Governor's Lecturer in 1995 and was promoted to Professor of Applied Synthetic Chemistry in 2006. In April 2011, he was appointed Sir Edward Frankland BP Professor of Inorganic Chemistry, succeeding Vernon C. Gibson.

Long's research focuses on transition-metal coordination and organometallic chemistry. He leads the Long Group at Imperial, which researches the design of molecular probes for biomedical imaging, the development of ligands and metal complexes for homogeneous catalysis, and the synthesis of electronic materials. The group has also investigated ferrocene-based compounds for applications including solar cells and molecular electronic devices.

In 1998, Long published the textbook Metallocenes: An Introduction to Sandwich Compounds.

== Honours and awards ==
Long was a Leverhulme Trust Research Fellow in 2009–10. He was elected a Fellow of the Royal Society of Chemistry in 2011. In 2018, he received a Royal Society Wolfson Research Merit Award, which he held until 2022.

Long was one of the recipients of the Royal Society of Chemistry's 2023 Interdisciplinary Prizes for his research into synthetic chemistry and its applications to functional materials and biomedical imaging.
