= Bader Award =

The Bader Award is a prize for organic chemistry awarded annually by the Royal Society of Chemistry since 1989. The winner, who receives £2,000 and a medal, gives a lecture tour in the UK.

== Winners ==
2024	Bruce Turnbull
2023	Marc Vendrell
2022	Ross Denton
2021	Alison Hulme
2020	Ed Anderson
2019	Jason Micklefield
2018	Joseph Harrity
2017	Michael Greaney
2016	Thomas Wirth
2015	Stephen Clark
2014	David Procter
2013	Jonathan Goodman
2012	John Murphy
2011	Karl J. Hale
2010	Kevin Booker-Milburn
2009	Douglas Philp
2008	Veronique Gouverneur
2007	Jonathan B. Spencer
2006	David Hodgson
2005	no award
2004	Robert S. Ward
2003	Hamish McNab
2002	Stuart Warren
2001	David R. M. Walton
2000	Thomas L. Gilchrist
1999	Richard J. Whitby
1998	Donald A. Whiting
1997	David A. Widdowson
1996	Ian Paterson
1995	George W. J. Fleet
1994	Andrew Bruce Holmes
1993	Roger Alder
1992	Martin R. Bryce
1991	William B. Motherwell
1990	Dudley Howard Williams
1989	Stephen G. Davies

== See also ==
- List of chemistry awards
