= Synthetic ribosome =

Synthetic ribosomes are artificial small-molecules that can synthesize peptides in a sequence-specific matter.

David Alan Leigh's lab built synthetic ribosome using a chemical structure based on a rotaxane.

The Cédric Orelle research group created ribosomes with tethered and inseparable subunits (or Ribo-T).
