= David J. Procter =

British chemist

David Procter
- Born: David John Procter; 1970 (age 55–56)
- Education: University of Leeds (BSc., PhD)
- Known for: Samarium catalysis Radical cascades Sulfonium cross-coupling Copper catalysis
- Awards: Young Heterocyclic Chemist Award (2015); Bader Award (2014); Liebig Lectureship (2014)
- Scientific career
- Fields: Organic Chemistry; Catalysis
- Workplaces: The University of Manchester
- Thesis: The development of a selenoxide-based asymmetric oxidation of sulfides to sulfoxides (1995)
- Doctoral advisor: Prof. Christopher Rayner
- Website: www.proctergroupresearch.com

David John Procter is a British chemist and a Professor in the Department of Chemistry at The University of Manchester. His research is based on organic chemistry and catalysis, specifically on radical cascades, sulfonium cross-coupling and copper catalysis.

== Education ==
Proctercompleted his Bsc in 1992 at University of Leeds. Upon graduation, he continued to read for his Doctor of Philosophy degree with Prof. Christopher Rayner on The development of a selenoxide-based asymmetric oxidation of sulfides to sulfoxides and successfully gained his PhD in 1995.

== Research and career ==
Procter completed his postdoctoral research with Prof. Robert Holton at Florida State University in Tallahassee, United States before moving to the University of Glasgow in 1997 as a Lecturer. In February 2004, he was promoted to the Senior Lecturer position and in September in the same year, was promoted to Reader in the Department of Chemistry at the University of Manchester. He was promoted to Professor in October 2008.

Procter's research is generally on organic synthesis and catalysis chemistry and is specifically based on radical cascades using the pivotal SET reagent samarium diiodide , metal-free sulfonium cross-coupling and copper catalysis.

Apart from research and lecturing, Procter has an established career fellowship (2015 - 2020) at the Engineering and Physical Sciences Research Council and an author profile in Angewandte Chemie. Procter was also a Leverhulme Trust Research Fellow (2013 - 2014) and is the lead author of Organic Synthesis using Samarium Diiodide: A practical guide. He was the Engineering and Physical Sciences Research Council panel chair in March 2017, January 2013 and September 2011 and was the Head of Organic Chemistry in the Department of Chemistry at the University of Manchester from 2011 to 2014. In 2020, Procter became Head of the Department of Chemistry at the University of Manchester, a position he still holds as of 2025.

=== Notable work ===
The Procter research group has carried out a wide variety of research on the efficient construction of organic molecules. In 2015, he led a research on the synthesis of novel tri-cyclic organic compounds inspired by the antibacterial, pleuromutilin through Sm^{II}-mediated radical cyclization cascades of dialdehydes, prepared by a one-pot, copper catalyzed double organomagnesium addition to β‐chlorocyclohexenone. This was the first time that important analogues of the antibacterial was prepared, which previously was unable to be synthesized using the naturally occurring product.

The Procter research group has also invented metal-free cross-coupling processes with the aim to decrease the reliance of expensive and supply-risk transition metals. Examples include metal-free alkylation and arylation of benzothiophenes, metal-free synthesis of benzothiophenes by twofold C–H functionalization, and new reagents for metal-free C–H trifluoromethylthiolation in Trifluoromethyl sulfoxides.

=== Awards and nominations ===
- Young Heterocyclic Chemist Award (2015)
- Bader Award (2014)
- Liebig Lectureship (2014)

== Major reviews and publications ==
Recent Publications by Prof. David J. Procter (2025–present):

- Zhao, Huaibo; Fillippini, Dario; Chen, Yiding; Gallego-Gamo, Albert; Natrajan, Louise S.; Romano, Ciro; Procter, David J. (2025). "Activation of alcohols as sulfonium salts in the photocatalytic hetero-difunctionalization of alkenes". Nature Chemistry. 18 (2): 398–406. doi:10.1038/s41557-025-02003-7. PMC 12872449. PMID 41298939.
- Conboy, Orla; Rushworth, Emily Q.; Taylor, Christopher J.; Levy, Colin W.; Ortmayer, Mary; Whitehead, George F. S.; Yen, Andy; Romano, Ciro; Green, Anthony P.; Procter, David J. (2025). "Biocatalytic Activation of Sulfur Heteroaromatics Facilitates Dearomatizing Cross-Couplings to Set Stereogenic Centers or Axes". Journal of the American Chemical Society. 147 (46) jacs.5c16261: 43057–43066. doi:10.1021/jacs.5c16261. PMID 41187905.
- Mansell, Jack I.; Romano, Ciro; Procter, David J. (2025). "Contemporary Strategies in SmI_{2} Catalysis: A Reagent Reborn". Angewandte Chemie International Edition. 64 (46) e202519678. Bibcode:2025ACIE...6419678M. doi:10.1002/anie.202519678. PMC 12603992. PMID 41081444.
- Roy, Debayan; Mansell, Jack I.; Giorgia, Barison; Yu, Song; Katavic, Rocco; Romano, Ciro; Kaltsoyannis, Nikolas; Procter, David J. (2025). "SmI2-Catalyzed Coupling of Alkyl Housane Ketones and Alkenes in an Approach to Norbornanes". Angewandte Chemie International Edition. 64 (39) e202512018. doi:10.1002/anie.202512018. PMC 12455418. PMID 40626914.
