= Emma Raven =

British chemist and chemical biologist

FRSC, CChem Emma Raven
- Born: Emma Lloyd; 1967 (age 58–59); Northamptonshire
- Education: University of Leicester (BSc); Newcastle University (PhD)
- Occupations: Professor of Chemistry (University of Bristol)
- Organization: University of Bristol
- Awards: Fellow of the Royal Society of Chemistry (FRSC); Inorganic Biochemistry Award (2005); Reaction Kinetics and Mechanism Award (2008); Royal Society Wolfson Award (2017); Interdisciplinary Prize (2020)
- Website: https://emmaravenresearchgroup.wordpress.com/

Emma Raven (née Lloyd, born 1967) is a British chemist and chemical biologist. She is a Professor of Chemistry at the University of Bristol. She was previously a Professor at the University of Leicester. Her research work is concerned with the role of heme in biology, in particular on the mechanism of action, structures and biological function of heme proteins.

== Biography ==
Emma was born in Northamptonshire and was educated in state schools at Ruskin Junior and then Weavers School. She obtained a first class degree in chemistry from the University of Leicester in 1988. She subsequently moved to Newcastle University when she obtained her PhD in 1991, supervised by A Geoffrey Sykes, FRS.

== Career ==
With encouragement from A G Sykes, in 1992 she moved to the University of British Columbia where she worked with A G Mauk and Michael Smith, FRS. In 1994, she was offered a lectureship at the University of Leicester, where she worked for 23 years. In 2018, she moved to the University of Bristol.

== Awards and honours ==
Emma is a Fellow of the Royal Society of Chemistry (FRSC). She has received several awards from the Royal Society of Chemistry, including the Inorganic Biochemistry Award (2005), the Reaction Kinetics and Mechanism Award (2008), and the Interdisplinary Prize (2020). She also received a Royal Society Wolfson Award in 2017. She has been the recipient of research fellowships from the Wellcome Trust (2001), the Leverhulme Trust (2005, 2017) and the BBSRC (2006, 2013). She has served as President of the Royal Society of Chemistry Dalton (Inorganic) Division (2016-2018).

== Family ==
Emma married Neil Raven in 1998. She has two younger brothers, both of them scientists; one of them, Daniel Lloyd, is a professor at the University of Kent.
