= Alan Brisdon =

British chemist

- Born: Alan K. Brisdon
- Education: University of Southampton (BSc., PhD)
- Known for: Fluorine Chemistry; Inorganic Synthesis
- Scientific career
- Fields: Inorganic chemistry Organometallic chemistry
- Workplaces: The University of Manchester
- Thesis: Matrix isolation infra-red and mass spectrometric studies of some arsenic and selenium oxides (1988)
- Website: fluorine.ch.man.ac.uk

Alan K. Brisdon is a British chemist and a Senior Lecturer in the Department of Chemistry at The University of Manchester. His research in general is based on fluorine chemistry, including on HCFCs, fluorine-containing organometallic systems, fluorophosphines and fluorine-containing materials, such as ionic liquids and fluorographenes.

== Education ==
Brisdon completed his Bachelor of Science at University of Southampton. Upon graduation, he continued to read for his Doctor of Philosophy degree on Matrix isolation infra-red and mass spectrometric studies of some arsenic and selenium oxides and successfully gained his PhD in 1988.

== Research and career ==
Upon completing his PhD, Brisdon worked for one year on a UKEA (Winfrith) funded project investigating on design, construction and testing of systems for sampling directly from a reaction chamber at or above atmospheric pressures and at high temperatures. He then completed his postdoctoral research at University of Leicester where he worked on synthesis of high oxidation-state transition metal fluorides and oxide-fluorides via high pressure and liquid fluorine syntheses and on the fluorination of the fullerene's, C_{60}and C_{70}. He then joined the University of Manchester as a Lecturer and was later on promoted to the position of Senior Lecturer.

Brisdon's research in general is based on fluorine chemistry, including on HFCs, fluorine-containing organometallic systems, fluorophosphines and fluorine-containing materials, such as ionic liquids and fluorographenes.

Brisdon is the current Director of Teaching and Learning at Apart from research and lecturing in the Department of Chemistry at The University of Manchester. He also is a member of the Fluorine Groups in the Royal Society of Chemistry as well as the American Chemical Society and is also part of the editorial board in the Journal of Fluorine Chemistry.

=== Notable work ===
Brisdon is the author of Inorganic Spectroscopic Methods, a book which elaborates and discusses several spectroscopic techniques that can be used in inorganic chemistry, including vibrational spectroscopy, resonance spectroscopy, UV/Vis Spectroscopy and mass spectrometry.

In 2014, Brisdon also participated in a research which showed how the use of 2,2,2-trifluoroethanol as solvent would be able to improve the efficiency of gold catalyzed A^{3}-reactions. The research also showed that the rate of the reaction can be accelerated by the use of a microwave reactor.

In 2001, Brisdon also reported on the synthesis of new fluorovinyl-containing organometallic complexes and fluorovinyl-containing phosphine ligands of the type R_{n}P(CX=CF_{2})_{3-n}(n =1, 2; X = Cl, F) and their complexes. The research showed how HFC-134a and HCFC-133a with two equivalents of butyllithium can form fluorovinyllithium reagents (CF_{2}=CFLi and CF_{2}=CClLi). These reagents were then used to synthesize these new novel fluorovinyl-containing transition metal and main-group compounds.

== Major publications ==
- Brisdon, Alan K.; Price, Gregory A.; Flower, Kevin R.; Pritchard, Robin G.; Quayle, Peter (2014). "Solvent effects in gold-catalysed A^{3}-coupling reactions". Tetrahedron Letters. 55 (1): 151–154. doi:10.1016/j.tetlet.2013.10.141.
- Brisdon, Alan K.; Goudarziafshar, Hamid; Keypour, Hassan; Pritchard, Robin G.; Rezaeivala, Majid (2008). "New macrocyclic Schiff-base complexes incorporating a phenanthroline unit. Part 2: Template synthesis of some manganese^{(II)} complexes and crystal structure studies". Inorganica Chimica Acta. 361 (5): 1415–1420. doi:10.1016/j.ica.2007.09.018.
- Brisdon, Alan K.; Barnes, N.A.; Ellis, M.J.; Pritchard, R.G. (2001). "Recent advances in fluorovinyl-containing compounds". Journal of Fluorine Chemistry. 112 (1): 35–45. doi:10.1016/S0022-1139(01)00479-1.
- Brisdon, Alan K. (18 June 1998). Inorganic Spectroscopic Methods. United Kingdom: Oxford University Press. ISBN 9780198559498.
- Brisdon, Alan K.; Bishop, Peter; Brisdon, Brian J.; Marsh, Patsy; Mahon, Mary F. (1998). "X-Ray crystallographic and extended X-ray absorption fine structure studies of gold^{(I)} complexes containing weak intermolecular interactions". J. Chem. Soc., Dalton Trans. (4): 675–682. doi:10.1039/A707650I.
