= Dek Woolfson =

British chemist and professor

- Born: Derek N. Woolfson; 7 July 1965 (age 60)
- Education: University of Oxford, UK University of Cambridge, UK
- Known for: Research on coiled-coil proteins, de novo protein design, peptide assembly, and synthetic biology
- Awards: Medimmune Protein and Peptide Science Award of the Royal Society of Chemistry, 2011. Royal Society Wolfson Research Merit Award, 2014. Interdisciplinary Prize of the Royal Society of Chemistry, 2016. Humboldt Research Award, also known as the Humboldt Prize, 2020. Vincent du Vigneaud Award of the American Peptide Society, 2025. Fellow of the Royal Society, 2025.
- Scientific career
- Fields: Chemical biology Protein design Synthetic biology
- Institutions: University of Bristol and University of Copenhagen
- Doctoral advisor: Dudley Williams FRS

Derek Dek Woolfson FRS (born 7 July 1965) is a British chemist and biochemist. He is a professor of chemistry and biochemistry at the University of Bristol, and professor of protein design at the University of Copenhagen, where he is also Director of the Novo Nordisk Foundation Center for Protein Design.

== Early life and education ==
Woolfson was born on 7 July 1965 in Birmingham, UK. He attended King's Norton Boys' School (1976–1983). Woolfson was awarded a Bachelor of Science degree in chemistry from the University of Oxford in 1987, doing undergraduate research with Christopher M. Dobson. He obtained his PhD in chemistry and biochemistry from the University of Cambridge in 1991 under the supervision of Prof. D. H. Williams (chemistry) and Dr. P. A. Evans (biochemistry).

== Career ==
Woolfson undertook post-doctoral research at University College London (1991–1992), and at the University of California, Berkeley (1992–1994), before accepting a Lectureship in Biochemistry at the University of Bristol from 1994 to 1995.

The following year, Woolfson was appointed Lecturer and later Professor of Biochemistry at the University of Sussex, where he worked until 2005. Since 2005, Woolfson has held a joint chair between the Schools of Chemistry and Biochemistry at the University of Bristol.

Woolfson was Principal Investigator and Director of the UKRI-funded Synthetic Biology Research Centre, BrisSynBio, at the University of Bristol. He was Director of the Bristol BioDesign Institute at the University of Bristol and Founding Director of the Max Planck–Bristol Centre for Minimal Biology. In 2025, he took up a professorship in protein design at the University of Copenhagen and established the Novo Nordisk Foundation Center for Protein Design.

== Research ==
Woolfson applies chemical and physical methods and principles to understand biological phenomena, such as protein folding and stability.

He is interested in how weak non-covalent interactions determine the structures and functions of proteins; and also the challenge of rational protein design and how this can be applied in synthetic biology and biotechnology.

Using a combination of rational and computational design, Woolfson explores making completely new protein structures and materials not known to natural biology.

The current focuses of his group are in the parametric design of protein structures, assemblies and materials; and in porting these into living cells to augment natural biology.

His work focuses on the folding, assembly, prediction, modelling and design of coiled-coil proteins.

== Awards and honours ==
- 2011 – Medimmune Protein and Peptide Science Award of the Royal Society of Chemistry.
- 2014 – Royal Society Wolfson Research Merit Award.
- 2016 – Interdisciplinary Prize of the Royal Society of Chemistry
- 2020 – Humboldt Research Award, also known as the Humboldt Prize
- 2025 – Vincent du Vigneaud Award of the American Peptide Society
- 2025 – Fellow of the Royal Society
