= Sir Samuel Hall Professor of Chemistry =

The Sir Samuel Hall Chair of Chemistry is the named Chair of Chemistry in the School of Chemistry at the University of Manchester, established through an endowment of £36,000 in 1913 by the Hall family. This chair has been occupied by the following chemists:

- 2014- David Alan Leigh FRS
- 2005 - 2014 Ian Hillier
- 1947-1954 Sir Ewart Jones FRS
- 1944-1947 Sir Edmund Hirst FRS
- 1938-1944 Alexander R. Todd, Baron Todd FRS
- 1935-1938 Sir Ian Heilbron FRS
- 1922-1935 Arthur Lapworth FRS
