= Jason Micklefield =

British Biochemist

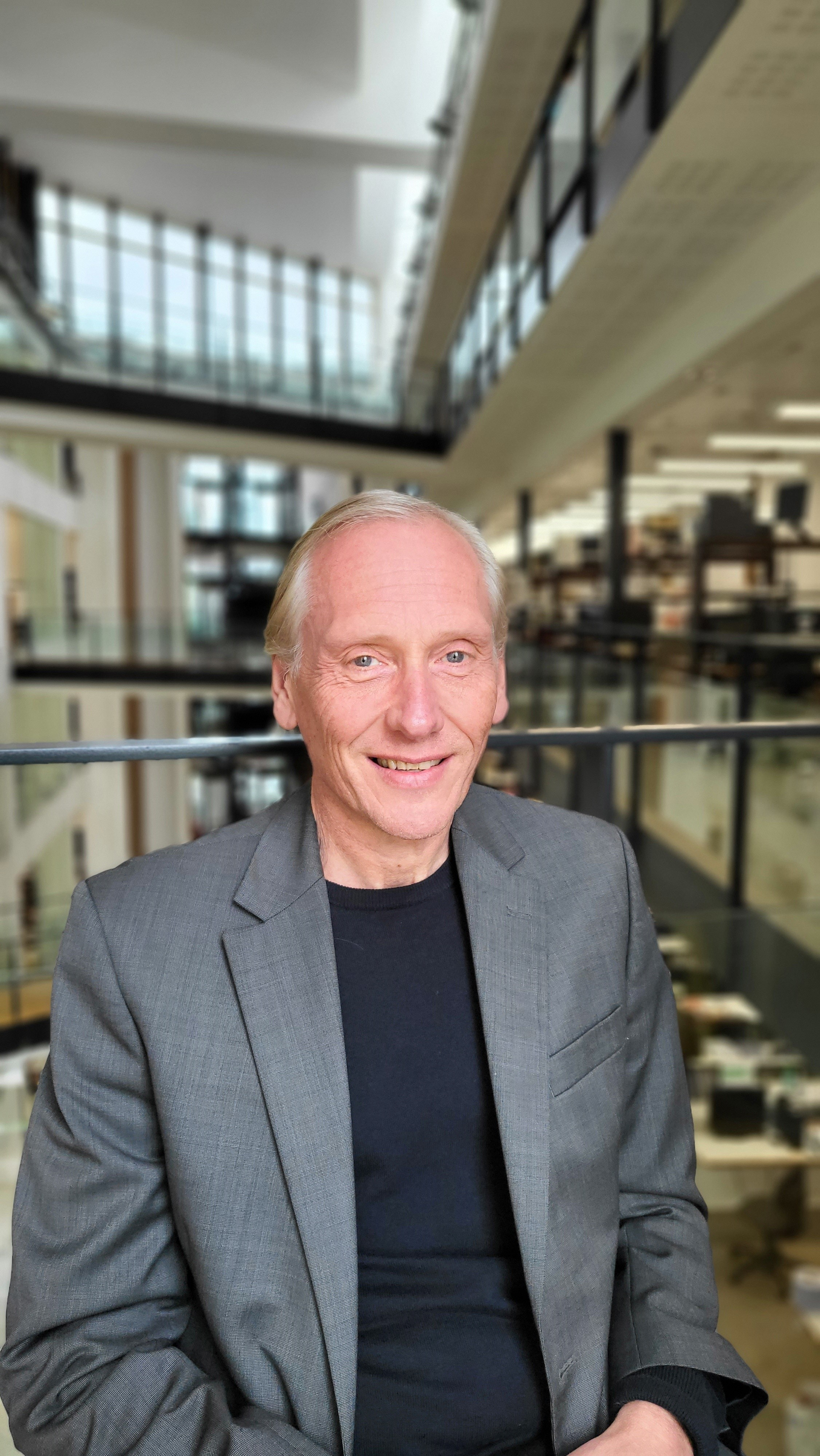
- Professor Jason Micklefield at the Manchester Institute of Biotechnology
- Born: Jason Micklefield
- Education: Hull University (BSc) University of Cambridge (PhD)
- Known for: Discovery, characterisation and engineering of enzymes and biosynthetic pathways. Biocatalysis and integrated catalysis. Modified nucleic acids and orthogonal riboswitches.
- Scientific career
- Fields: Organic Chemistry, Biochemistry and Molecular Biology
- Workplaces: University of Washington Birkbeck College, University of London University of Manchester Imperial College London
- Doctoral advisor: Prof. Sir Alan Battersby
- Website: https://www.micklefieldlab.chemistry.manchester.ac.uk/

Jason Micklefield is a British Biochemist and a professor in the Department of Chemistry at Imperial College London. His research involves the discovery, characterisation and engineering of biosynthetic pathways to new bioactive natural products, particularly antibiotics. He is also interested in the discovery, structure, mechanism and engineering of enzymes for synthetic applications, including the integration of enzymes with chemocatalysis for telescoping routes to pharmaceuticals and other valuable products.

== Education ==
Micklefield attended Royds Comprehensive School in Leeds. He received his BSc. Degree in Chemistry from Hull University in 1989 and earned a Ph.D. from the University of Cambridge in 1993 working with Professor Sir Alan Battersby to complete the first total synthesis of haem d1, a coenzyme in bacteria.

== Career and research ==
Following his PhD, Micklefield was awarded a NATO fellowship to work on enzyme mechanisms and biosynthesis with Professor Heinz G. Floss at the University of Washington, Seattle USA. In 1995, Micklefield was appointed Lecturer in Organic Chemistry at Birkbeck College, University of London, before moving to Manchester in 1998. He was promoted to Professor of Chemical Biology at the University of Manchester in 2008 where his research group is based in the Manchester Institute of Biotechnology (MIB). Micklefield is also visiting professor at the East China University of Science and Technology (ECUST) in Shanghai. He is co-director of the EPSRC Centre for Doctoral Training in Integrated Catalysis (iCAT) and served as Director of the BBSRC Natural Product Discovery and Bioengineering Network (NPRONET). Micklefield was the recipient of the RSC Interdisciplinary Prize (2022), Bader Award (2019), Natural Product Reports (NPR) Lecture Award (2008). He also received a European Research Council (ERC) Advanced grant and his lab also won the RSC Horizon Prize & Rita and John Cornforth Award (2023).

Micklefield's research focuses on natural product biosynthesis, pathway engineering and biocatalysis. His lab developed new methods for engineering complex NRPS enzymes that deliver new lipopeptide antibiotics. They have discovered and characterised hybrid NRPS-PKS assembly lines producing the structurally unique antibiotic K16. Micklefield's team also discovered and determined structures of novel ATP-dependent ligase enzymes, from PKS-NRPS pathways, which were engineered to produce agrochemicals and pharmaceuticals including drugs in clinical trials for COVID-19. New synthetic biology approaches were also used to create a de novo pathway to thaxtomin phytotoxin derivatives, with improved herbicidal properties for crop protection. In addition to biosynthesis, Micklefield is widely recognised for his research in biocatalysis. His lab employed structure-guided mutagenesis and directed evolution to improve activity, expand the substrate scope and switch the regioselectivities of halogenase enzymes. They showed how engineered halogenases can be integrated with Pd-catalysed cross-coupling chemistry, in one-pot reactions, to affect the direct regioselective arylation, alkenylation, cyanation and further functionalisation of C-H positions in diverse scaffolds. Micklefield's lab also characterised various methyltransferases, demonstrating how these can be used in the regioselective alkyl-diversification of tetrahydroisoquinolines, rapamycin immunosuppressive agents and other bioactive natural and non-natural products. His lab succeeded in engineering orthogonal methyltransferases creating alternative bioalkylation pathways and developed methods for selective derivatisation of tyrosine residues in peptides/proteins using methyltransferases and SAM analogues for labelling etc. His team also characterised, engineered and developed many other important biocatalysts. The Micklefield lab is also engaged in nucleic acids research, re-engineering the first orthogonal riboswitches (genetic tools and biosensors).

== Awards and honours ==
Royal Society of Chemistry, Chemistry Biology Interface Horizon Prize: Rita and John Cornforth Award (2023) Also see RSC Video: Horizon Prize 2023

Royal Society of Chemistry, Interdisciplinary Prize (2022)

Royal Society of Chemistry, Bader Award (2019)
