= Sam Hay =

Sam Hay may refer to:

- Sam Hay (footballer)
- Sam Hay (umpire)
- Sam Hay (chemist)
