= Roger Alder =

British academic

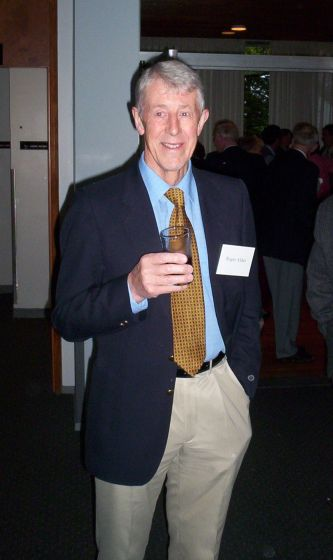

Roger William Alder, FRS is an Emeritus Professor of organic chemistry at the University of Bristol. He joined Bristol in 1965 as an Assistant Lecturer.

His research involves the study of novel compounds with unusual properties, such as proton sponges and stable carbenes.

Alder received the Royal Society of Chemistry Bader Award for organic chemistry in 1993. He has been a fellow of the Royal Society since 2007.
