= Nancy Lane Perham =

Canadian cell biologist (1936–2025)

Nancy Lane Perham OBE FSB FRSA FRMS
- Born: Nancy Jane Lane; 1936
- Died: 23 November 2025 (aged 89)
- Spouse: Richard Nelson Perham (m. 1969; died 2015)
- Children: 2
- Awards: fellow of Girton College, Cambridge, Officer of the Order of the British Empire, honorary doctorate

Academic background
- Education: University of Oxford, Dalhousie University, Lady Margaret Hall
- Thesis: A cytological study of secretory processes in gastropods, with special reference to the problem of neurosecretion (1963)

Academic work
- Institutions: University of Cambridge

Nancy Jane Lane Perham (née Lane; 1936 – 23 November 2025) was a Canadian cell biologist and artist, and a full professor at the University of Cambridge who specialised in cell–cell interaction. Lane Perham was an advocate for women in science, chairing the Working Party on Women in SET that produced The Rising Tide report (1993), and co-founding a university accreditation scheme, the Athena Project.

== Early life and education ==
Nancy Jane Lane was born in 1936 to journalist Frances (née Gilbert) and Temple Lane, a civil servant, in Halifax, Nova Scotia. She was educated at Queen Elizabeth High School, where she was advised that women could not be scientists, only lab technicians. She undertook her undergraduate degree and a Masters of Science at Dalhousie University.

After she graduated, she was awarded the Imperial Order of the Daughters of the Empire scholarship, and won the Governor General's Gold Medal, which allowed her to undertake her doctoral study at the University of Oxford. She completed her PhD titled A cytological study of secretory processes in gastropods, with special reference to the problem of neurosecretion at Oxford in 1963.

== Academic career ==
After post-doctoral positions at Albert Einstein College of Medicine in New York and Yale University, Lane Perham joined the faculty of the University of Cambridge in 1968, rising to full professor. She was described as a "brilliant microscopist". Her research focused on cell–cell interaction and cell junctions, such as gap junctions and tight junctions, especially in invertebrates. Besides studying cell structures and interactions, she also painted them. Some of her works appeared on journal covers and some were selected by David Hockney to appear in the Royal Academy of Art's 1995 Summer Exhibition.

Lane Perham was an advocate for women in science. She was asked by the then Prime Minister, John Major, to chair the Working Party on Women in SET after William Waldegrave's 1993 White Paper on the British science system, Realizing Our Potential, had devoted one whole paragraph to women, but noted that they were the single most undervalued human resource in Britain. The working party produced the 1993 report The Rising Tide. Lane Perham co-founded the Athena Project, and was founder of WiSETI, a Cambridge initiative to advance women in science, technology and engineering.

== Personal life and death ==
Lane Perham was married to biochemist Richard Nelson Perham, Master of St John's College, from 1969 until his death in 2015. They had two children together. She died on 23 November 2025, at the age of 89.

== Honours and awards ==
Nancy Lane Perham was a Life Fellow of Girton College at Cambridge. She was appointed Officer of the Order of the British Empire (OBE) in 1994 for services to science.

She held honorary doctorates from six universities, including from the University of Surrey in 2005. She was inducted into the Nova Scotia Science Hall of Fame in 2006.

== Selected works ==
- Lane, Nancy Jane (1979). "Freeze-fracture and tracer studies on the intercellular junctions of insect rectal tissues". Tissue and Cell. 11 (3): 481–506. doi:10.1016/0040-8166(79)90058-2. PMID 494238. Wikidata Q42440068.
- Lane, Nancy Jane (1963). "Microvilli on the external surfaces of gastropod tentacles and body-walls". Journal of Cell Science. S3-104 (68): 495–504. doi:10.1242/jcs.s3-104.68.495. Wikidata Q123359166.
- Lane, Nancy Jane; Carter, Yvonne; Ashburner, Michael (1972). "Puffs and salivary gland function: The fine structure of the larval and prepupal salivary glands ofDrosophila melanogaster". Wilhelm Roux' Archiv fur Entwicklungsmechanik der Organismen. 169 (3): 216–238. doi:10.1007/bf00582554. PMID 28304626. Wikidata Q89557138.
- Manni, Lucia; Lane, Nancy Jane; Jean-Stéphane Joly; Gasparini, Fabio; Stefano Tiozzo; Federico Caicci; Giovanna Zaniolo; Paolo Burighel (2004). "Neurogenic and non-neurogenic placodes in ascidians". Journal of Experimental Zoology. Part B: Molecular and Developmental Evolution. 302 (5): 483–504. doi:10.1002/jez.b.21013. PMID 15384166. Wikidata Q42468056.
- Lane, Nancy Jane (1969). "Intranuclear fibrillar bodies in actinomycin D-treated oocytes". Journal of Cell Biology. 40 (1): 286–291. doi:10.1083/jcb.40.1.286. PMC 2107599. PMID 5812427. Wikidata Q36190226.
- Lane, Nancy Jane (1967). "Spheroidal and ring nucleoli in amphibian oocytes. Patterns of uridine incorporation and fine structural features". Journal of Cell Biology. 35 (2): 421–434. doi:10.1083/jcb.35.2.421. PMC 2107143. PMID 6055993. Wikidata Q36188619.
- Manni, Lucia; Lane, Nancy Jane; Jean-Stéphane Joly; Gasparini, Fabio; Stefano Tiozzo; Federico Caicci; Giovanna Zaniolo; Paolo Burighel (2004). "Neurogenic and non-neurogenic placodes in ascidians". Journal of Experimental Zoology. Part B: Molecular and Developmental Evolution. 302 (5): 483–504. doi:10.1002/jez.b.21013. PMID 15384166. Wikidata Q42468056.
