= Véronique Gouverneur =

Belgian chemist

Véronique Gouverneur FRS
- Born: 8 November 1964 (age 61); Geel, Belgium
- Education: Université catholique de Louvain (MSc, PhD)
- Awards: Bader Award (2008); Distinguished Woman in Chemistry Award (2010); Royal Society Wolfson Research Merit Award (2013); Tilden Prize (2016); Fellow of the Royal Society (2019); Henri Moissan Prize (2021); Arthur C. Cope Award (2022)
- Scientific career
- Fields: Chemistry
- Workplaces: University of Oxford; Louis Pasteur University; Scripps Research Institute
- Doctoral advisor: Léon Ghosez
- Website: www.chem.ox.ac.uk/people/veronique-gouverneur

Véronique Gouverneur FRS (born 8 November 1964 in Geel, Belgium) is a Belgian-British chemist. She is the Waynflete Professor of Chemistry at Magdalen College at the University of Oxford in the United Kingdom. Prior to the Waynflete professorship, she held a tutorial fellowship at Merton College, Oxford. Her research on fluorine chemistry has received many professional and scholarly awards. She was elected a Member of the National Academy of Sciences in 2025.

== Education ==
Gouverneur obtained her undergraduate degree (a master's degree in chemistry), and then in 1991 her doctorate, from the Université catholique de Louvain. She moved in 1992 to the Scripps Research Institute in the US, returning to Europe in 1994. She accepted a position of Maître de Conférence at Louis Pasteur University, working with Charles Mioskowski and was associate member of the Institut de Science et d'Ingénierie Supramoléculaires.

== Career and research ==
She joined the department of chemistry at Oxford in 1998, becoming reader in 2006 and professor in 2008. In her research career, she chose fluorine chemistry as a distinctive area to focus on because fluorine compounds have many applications, including in pharmaceutical drugs and in positron emission tomography (PET) scans. She has also had visiting professor posts at the University of Paris X and the Shanghai Institute of Organic Chemistry. In 2022, she was appointed as the Waynflete Professor of Chemistry, a post that dates back to 1865.

== Awards and honours ==
Gouverneur won the AstraZeneca Research Award for organic chemistry in 2005. She was the 2008 winner of the Royal Society of Chemistry (RSC) Bader Award, "for her important contributions to synthetic organofluorine chemistry." In 2010, she was elected Fellow of the Royal Society of Chemistry and received the IUPAC Distinguished Woman in Chemistry Award. In 2011 she was awarded the Liebig Lectureship Award of the Organic Division of the German Chemical Society. In 2012, she was holding the Blaise Pascal Chair (ENS/CEA, France). In 2013, the UK's Royal Society selected her as one of 27 Royal Society Wolfson Research Merit Award holders. In 2015, Gouverneur received the American Chemical Society Award for Creative Work in Fluorine Chemistry "for her contribution to late-stage fluorination and for invigorating creatively the field of [^{18}F] radiochemistry for applications in Positron Emission Tomography." In 2016, she was an International Visiting Research Scholar of the Peter Wall Institute for Advanced Studies (University of British Columbia) and held the Tetrahedron Chair at the Belgian Organic Synthesis Symposium (BOSS) meeting. That year, she received the RSC Tilden Prize for her interdisciplinary work in the area of organofluorine chemistry and radiochemistry, and the impact of her discoveries in medicine.

In 2017, Gouverneur become an elected member of the European Academy of Sciences (EURASC). She received a European Research Council Advanced Grant in 2018. In 2019, she received the RSC Organic Stereochemistry Award and the Prelog Medal (ETH). In the same year, she was the president of the Bürgenstock Conference—the Swiss Chemical Society conference on stereochemistry—and was elected a Fellow of the Royal Society in 2019. In 2021, she was awarded the Henri Moissan International Prize for her work in fluorine chemistry. In 2022, she received the Arthur C. Cope Award conferred by the American Chemical Society and was elected to the American Academy of Arts and Sciences. In 2022, she also received the European Chemical Society's award for Female Organic Chemist of the Year.

In 2024 Gouverneur was awarded Royal Society The Davy Medal for contributions to the field of fluorine chemistry with applications in both medicine and positron emission tomography imaging.
