= Lu Shin Wong =

British chemist

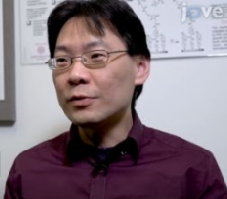
- Dr. Lu Shin Wong
- Born: Lu Shin Wong
- Education: University of Nottingham (B Pharm.); University of Bradford (PG Dip); University of Southampton(PhD)
- Known for: Biocatalysis; Nanofabrication
- Scientific career
- Fields: Industrial Biotechnology; Materials Chemistry
- Workplaces: The University of Manchester
- Thesis: Development & application of UV-visible microspectrometry to solid phase organic chemistry (2005)
- Doctoral advisor: Prof. Mark Bradley

Lu Shin Wong is a Reader in the Department of Chemistry at The University of Manchester. His research in general is based on industrial biotechnology and materials chemistry, specifically on nanofabrication and biocatalysis.

== Education ==
Wong completed his Bachelor of Pharmacy in 1997 at University of Nottingham and later spent two years at University of Bradford pursuing a part time Postgraduate diploma in clinical pharmacy before moving to University of Southampton to read his Doctor of Philosophy degree on Development & application of UV-visible microspectrometry to solid phase organic chemistry which he successfully completed in 2005. His PhD was supervised by Mark Bradley.

== Research and career ==
Upon graduation in 2005, Wong worked as a postdoctoral researcher with Jason Micklefield at the Manchester Institute of Biotechnology investigating on the application of chemical biology and surface chemistry to biomolecular-array technologies. He later received an EPSRC Life Science Interface research fellowship in 2008 where he worked with Chad A. Mirkin at the International Institute for Nanotechnology in Northwestern University before returning to the University of Manchester as a lecturer in 2011. He was later promoted to the position of senior lecturer in the Department of Chemistry at The University of Manchester.

Wong's research in general is based on industrial biotechnology and materials chemistry, specifically on nanofabrication and biocatalysis.

=== Notable work ===
In 2008, Wong took part in a research with Jason Micklefield where they developed a new method to manufacture protein microarrays at a much faster and efficient rate than what has been previously published. The research also showed that the new technique was protein friendly, with the critical tag fused to the protein being smaller thus reducing requirements of alternative techniques such as protein capture. This also showed that this reduced the likely hood of disruption to the protein's folding. In 2015, Wong also demonstrated the use of the substrate set benzaldehyde and furan in a Paternò–Büchi reaction.

In 2017, Wong also showed how the enzyme silicatein from the sponge Suberites domuncula can hydrolyze a variety of organosiloxanes and form others without chlorosilanes, and further demonstrated the enzymes ability to carry out this task in organic solvents at relatively high temperatures, sometimes with yields between 80 and 90%. Organosiloxanes are used in a wide variety of lubricants and coatings, and chemists use the molecules as protecting groups in organic synthesis and the previous known technique of forming Si-O bonds from chlorosilanes require a lot of energy to make and can lead to acidic waste. The material is also not recyclable as there is no way to break down these bonds in polymeric organosiloxanes.

In 2018, Wong and his research team developed a new sophisticated hydrogel system (using polyacrylamide polymers with azobenzene cross linker) with reversibly tuneable physical stiffness, controlled by either near-UV or blue light exposure which allow the control of stiffening of a cell's external environment via irradiating the hydrogel with specific wavelengths of light. The research showed that the use of polyacrylamide polymers with azobenzene cross linker's in this system also negated the need for cell behaviour-altering treatments.

== Major publications ==
- Wong, Lu Shin; Thirlway, Jenny; Micklefield, Jason (2008). "Direct Site-Selective Covalent Protein Immobilization Catalyzed by a Phosphopantetheinyl Transferase". American Chemical Society. 130 (37): 12456–12464. doi:10.1021/ja8030278. PMID 18722432.
- Wong, Lu Shin; Agger, Jonathan; Thompson, Mathew P. (2015). "Paternò–Büchi Reaction as a Demonstration of Chemical Kinetics and Synthetic Photochemistry Using a Light Emitting Diode Apparatus". J. Chem. Educ. 92 (10): 1716–1720. Bibcode:2015JChEd..92.1716T. doi:10.1021/acs.jchemed.5b00129.
- Wong, Lu Shin; Dakhili, S. Yasin Tabatabaei; Caslin, Stephanie A.; Quayle, Peter; Faponle, Abayomi S.; de Visser, Sam P. (2017). "Recombinant silicateins as model biocatalysts in organosiloxane chemistry". PNAS. 114 (27): E5285–E5291. doi:10.1073/pnas.1613320114. PMC 5502584. PMID 28630316.
- Wong, Lu Shin; Lee, I.-Ning; Richards, David; Dobre, Oana; Ballestrem, Christoph; Curran, Judith M.; Hunt, John A.; Richardson, Stephen M.; Swift, Joe (2018). "Photoresponsive Hydrogels with Photoswitchable Mechanical Properties Allow Time-Resolved Analysis of Cellular Responses to Matrix Stiffening". ACS Appl. Mater. Interfaces. 10 (9): 7765–7776. doi:10.1021/acsami.7b18302. PMC 5864053. PMID 29430919.
- Wong, Lu Shin; Valles, Morgane; Krainer, Florian W.; Glieder, Anton (2018). "Parallelized biocatalytic scanning probe lithography for the additive fabrication of conjugated polymer structures". Nanoscale. 10 (15): 7185–7193. doi:10.1039/C8NR01283K. PMID 29620786.
