= Nigel Scrutton =

British biochemist (born 1964)

Nigel Scrutton FRS FRSB FRSC
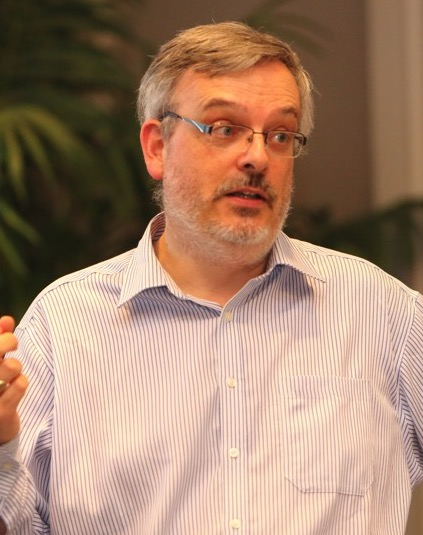
- Born: Nigel Shaun Scrutton; 2 April 1964 (age 62); Batley, West Riding of Yorkshire
- Citizenship: British
- Education: King's College London (BSc); University of Cambridge (PhD, ScD)
- Awards: Colworth Medal (1999)
- Scientific career
- Fields: Biological Chemistry, Biophysics, Biotechnology, Synthetic Biology, Quantum Biology
- Workplaces: University of Manchester; University of Leicester; University of Cambridge
- Thesis: Mechanistic and structural studies on glutathione reductase by protein engineering (1988)
- Doctoral advisor: Richard Perham
- Website: www.research.manchester.ac.uk/portal/Nigel.Scrutton.html

Nigel Shaun Scrutton (born 2 April 1964) FRS FRSB FRSC is a British biochemist and biotechnology researcher known for his work on enzyme catalysis, biophysics and synthetic biology. He is Director of the UK Future Biomanufacturing Research Hub, Director of the Fine and Speciality Chemicals Synthetic Biology Research Centre (SYNBIOCHEM), and Co-founder, Director and Chief Scientific Officer of the 'chemicals-from-biology' company C3 Biotechnologies Ltd. He is Professor of Enzymology and Biophysical Chemistry in the Department of Chemistry at the University of Manchester. He is a former Director of the Manchester Institute of Biotechnology (MIB) (2010 to 2020).

== Early life and education ==
Scrutton was born in Batley, West Riding of Yorkshire and was brought up in Cleckheaton where he went to Whitcliffe Mount School. Scrutton graduated from King's College London with a first class Bachelor of Science degree in Biochemistry in 1985. He was a Benefactors' Scholar at St John's College, Cambridge where he completed his doctoral research (PhD) in 1988 supervised by Richard Perham. He was a Research Fellow of St John's College, Cambridge (1989–92) and a Fellow / Director of Studies at Churchill College, Cambridge (1992–95). He was awarded a Doctor of Science (ScD) degree in 2003 by the University of Cambridge.

== Career and research ==
Following his PhD, Scrutton was appointed as Lecturer (1995), then Reader (1997) and Professor (1999) at the University of Leicester before being appointed Professor at the University of Manchester in 2005. He has held successive research fellowships over 29 years from the Royal Commission for the Exhibition of 1851 (1851 Research Fellowship), St John's College, Cambridge, the Royal Society (Royal Society University Research Fellow and Royal Society Wolfson Research Merit Award), the Lister Institute of Preventive Medicine, the Biotechnology and Biological Sciences Research Council (BBSRC) and the Engineering and Physical Sciences Research Council (EPSRC). He has been Visiting Professor at Tsinghua University (Beijing, China) and Cardiff University (UK), and adjunct professor at VISTEC (Thailand) and Beijing University of Chemical Technology (China).

He has made major contributions to the study of enzyme catalysis, the mechanisms and structures of enzymes and the photochemistry of photoreceptor proteins. His group has investigated quantum tunnelling and protein dynamics in enzyme H-transfer and conformational ensemble sampling in electron transfer reactions. He has also made contributions to enzyme kinetics, coenzyme chemistry, protein engineering, directed evolution, synthetic biology, biological engineering, biocatalysis and metabolic engineering, including the first rational redesign of the coenzyme specificity of an enzyme, the establishment of automated microorganism bioengineering platforms for the production of chemicals (e.g. fuels, materials, active pharmaceutical ingredients) and the discovery of new riboflavin cofactors.

He has supervised about 70 students for the degree of Doctor of Philosophy, as well as about 60 postdoctoral research workers. He has published over 500 research papers and several patents.

In 2015, Scrutton co-founded the company C3 Biotechnologies Ltd to commercialise technologies for chemicals, fuels and materials production.

He was founding Director of the Manchester Synthetic Biology Research Centre SYNBIOCHEM, which he established in 2014 following major investment by the UK government in synthetic biology. In 2019, he established and became Director of the UK Future Biomanufacturing Research Hub, which is developing new technologies to accelerate bio-based manufacturing in the UK in three key sectors – pharmaceuticals, chemicals and engineering materials. He has served on several national committees, including research council / funding committees (BBSRC, EPSRC, Royal Society) and strategic advisory boards / scientific steering groups (e.g. Science and Technology Facilities Council). He is a former member of BBSRC Council (2021-24).

While serving as Director, the MIB was awarded the Queen's Anniversary Prize for Higher and Further Education (2018–20).

=== Awards and honours ===
Scrutton was awarded the Colworth Medal in 1999 from the Biochemical Society; the Enzyme Chemistry Award (Charmian Medal) from the Royal Society of Chemistry in 2002; the Rita and John Cornforth Award from the Royal Society of Chemistry in 2009; the Interdisciplinary Prize from the Royal Society of Chemistry in 2019.

Scrutton was elected a Fellow of the Royal Society (FRS) in 2020; Fellow of the Royal Society of Chemistry (FRSC) in 1996; a Fellow of the Royal Society of Biology (FRSB) in 2009; a Member of the Lister Institute in 2004.

He is recipient of a number of academic awards including: Sambrooke Exhibition Prize (King's College London, University of London, 1983); William Robson Prize (King's College London, University of London, 1985); Benefactors' Scholarship (St John's College, University of Cambridge, 1985); Henry Humphreys Research Prize / Research Fellowship (St John's College, University of Cambridge, 1989).

== Personal life ==
Scrutton married Nia Francis Roberts in 1989 with whom he has two sons and one daughter.
