= Jim Feast =

British chemical scientist and academic

W. James Feast
- Born: 25 June 1938 (age 88)
- Education: University of Birmingham; University of Sheffield
- Known for: the Durham precursor route for creating polyacetylene
- Awards: Swinburn Medal (1994); Royal Society of Chemistry Interdisciplinary Award (2001); Royal Medal (2007)
- Scientific career
- Fields: Chemical synthesis
- Workplaces: Durham University; Max Planck Institute for Polymer Research

William James Feast CBE, FRS, FRSC (born 25 June 1938) is a British chemical scientist and academic.

== Early life ==
Feast was born in Birmingham to a school teacher and housewife, and was educated at the King Edward VI School in Lichfield, studying humanities but being redirected to scientific studies due to his 'inclination to sit and dream', which led to him calling himself an 'accidental chemist'.

He initially planned to study mathematics at university, but changed his mind after an interview with Rudolf Peierls at the University of Birmingham, and enrolled at the University of Sheffield to study chemistry, graduating with a Bsc in 1960. After graduation, he began to study for a PhD at the University of Birmingham in organo-fluorine chemistry, which he completed in 1963, staying until 1965 for the purpose of post-doctoral research. In 1965 he became a lecturer at Durham University, specifically Van Mildert College, where he stayed for over 35 years until his 2003 retirement. In 1967 he married his first wife Jenneke, with whom he has two daughters, Saskia and Marieke.

== Research and academic work ==
Despite his PhD in organo-fluorine chemistry he switched focus by 1970 to look more at polymer chemistry, specifically polymer synthesis after he had experimented with fluorinated diene monomers and 'found it fascinating that you could take a mobile, colourless fluid and produce a material that had potentially interesting properties.' He helped develop what is now known as the "Durham precursor route" to manufacturing polyacetylene, and during the 70s and 80s the polymer synthesis knowledge of Feast and his group led to invitations to work as a guest lecturer, and eventually he spent two months a year teaching at the Max Planck Institute for Polymer Research in Mainz.

During his time at Durham Feast was promoted up the academic ranks, rising from lecturer to senior lecturer in 1965 and professor in 1986. In 1996 he was made a Fellow of the Royal Society, and in 2006 was elected president for two years of the Royal Society of Chemistry. Other than his appointment at Durham he also held various guest and visiting lecturer positions, including at the University of Leuven between 1985 and 1988, Cornell University in 1993 and the California Institute of Technology in 1999.

== Retirement ==
He retired in 2003, but continues to work at Durham University as a research professor, and also at the Eindhoven University of Technology. In 2004 he was awarded an honorary DSc from the University of Warwick. He was appointed a Commander of the Order of the British Empire (CBE) for "services to polymer chemistry" in the 2007 New Year Honours. Later that year he was awarded a Royal Medal for "his outstanding contributions to chemical synthesis with far reaching implications, particularly for the field of functional polymeric materials."
