= Richard Perham =

English biochemist and professor

Richard Perham FRS FMedSci
- Born: Richard Nelson Perham; 27 April 1937; Brentford, Middlesex, England
- Died: 14 February 2015 (aged 77); Cambridge, England
- Education: University of Cambridge
- Awards: Fellow of the Royal Society (1984); Fellow of the Royal Society of Arts (1988); Fellow of the Academy of Medical Sciences (2005)
- Scientific career
- Fields: Biochemistry
- Workplaces: St John's College, Cambridge; Department of Biochemistry, Cambridge; MRC Laboratory of Molecular Biology
- Doctoral students: Nigel Scrutton
- Website: www.bioc.cam.ac.uk/news/richardperham

Richard Nelson Perham (27 April 1937 – 14 February 2015), was Professor of biochemistry at the University of Cambridge, and Master of St John's College, Cambridge 2004–07. He was also editor-in-chief of FEBS Journal (Federation of European Biochemical Societies) from 1998 to 2013.

== Education ==
Perham attended Latymer Upper School, then St John's College, Cambridge, where he completed his MA (Cantab), PhD and ScD. Perham then went on to become a MRC scholar at Laboratory of Molecular Biology (LMB), also at Cambridge.

== Research and career ==
Perham was known for his contributions to the chemistry of proteins in multimeric assemblies.

=== Societies ===
Perham was a member of the following organisations and societies:

- 1965 Biochemical Society member
- 1983 EMBO Member
- 1986 Royal Institution for Great Britain member
- 1992 Academia Europaea member

=== Awards and fellowships ===
His awards include:

- 1971 (EMBO) fellowship Max Planck Institute for Medical Research (Max-Planck-Institut für Medizinische Forschung), Heidelberg
- 1984 Fellow of the Royal Society (FRS)
- 1988 Fellow of the Royal Society of Arts (FRSA)
- 1993 Max Planck Research Prize
- 1998 Novartis Medal and Prize of the Biochemical Society
- 2000 Silver Medal of the Italian Biochemical Society
- 2005 Fellowship of the Academy of Medical Sciences (FMedSci)
- 2008 Edman Prize International Association of Protein Structure and Proteomics (IAPSAP)
- 2011 Diplôme d'Honneur of the Federation of European Biochemical Societies

=== Selected bibliography ===
- Perham, Richard N (1975). Instrumentation in amino acid sequence analysis. London New York: Academic Press. ISBN 978-0-12-551250-3.
- Perham, Richard N; Chapman, Stephen; Scrutton, Nigel (2002). Flavins and flavoproteins 2002: proceedings of the Fourteenth International Symposium, St. John's College, University of Cambridge, UK, July 14–18, 2002. Berlin: Rudolf Weber, Agency for Scientific Publications. ISBN 978-3-00-010229-5.
- Perham, Richard N; Baumeister, Wolfgang; Johnson, Louise; Steven, Alasdair (1975). Instrumentation in amino acid sequence analysis. London New York: Academic Press. ISBN 978-0-12-551250-3.

== Personal life ==
Perham was married to Canadian cell biologist Nancy Lane Perham, and they had two children together.

Academic offices
Preceded by Peter Goddard	Master of St John's College, Cambridge; 2004–2007	Succeeded by Chris Dobson
