= Sam Hay (chemist) =

New Zealand chemist

- Born: Sam Hay
- Education: University of Otago (Bsc.); Australian National University (PhD)
- Known for: Biotechnology; Quantum Mechanics; Biophysics; Kinetic Modelling
- Awards: BBSRC David Phillips fellowship (2010); Rita and John Cornforth Award (2009)
- Scientific career
- Fields: Computational Chemistry; Theoretical Chemistry
- Institutions: The University of Manchester
- Thesis: Protein engineering of novel porphyrin/quinone-binding proteins for light-induced electron transfer (2005)
- Doctoral advisor: Prof. Thomas Wydrzynski

Sam Hay is a chemist from New Zealand and a Professor of Biophysical Chemistry in the Department of Chemistry and Manchester Institute of Biotechnology (MIB) at The University of Manchester. His research in general is based on computational chemistry and theoretical chemistry, specifically on the areas of In silico Enzymology, quantum mechanics roles in biological processes, kinetic modelling of complex reactions and high pressure spectroscopy.

== Education ==
Hay completed his Bachelor of Science degree in biochemistry in 2000 at University of Otago. He then joined the Australian National University for his Doctor of Philosophy degree and successfully completed it in 2004, and his work published in 2005. His PhD on Protein engineering of novel porphyrin/quinone-binding proteins for light-induced electron transfer was supervised by Prof. Thomas Wydrzynski.

== Research and career ==
Upon completing his PhD, Hay undertook postdoctoral research as a Wenner - Gren visiting Post Doctoral Fellow at Stockholm University where he spent time doing research on electrochemistry from 2004 to 2005. He then joined the University of Manchester and worked with Prof. Nigel Scrutton as a Post Doctoral Research Associate. In 2010, he became a Research Fellow at the University of Manchester, and in 2017 promoted to the position of Senior Lecturer. In 2019, he was promoted to the position of Reader and in 2021, he was promoted to Professor.

Hay's research is generally based on computational chemistry and theoretical chemistry, specifically on the areas of In silico Enzymology, quantum mechanics roles in biological processes, kinetic modelling of complex reactions and high pressure spectroscopy.

=== Notable work ===
In 2012, Hay and Nigel Scrutton published a paper on how vibrations may affect enzyme-catalyzed reactions. The paper provided an insight to motions which may reduce the size of the energy barrier along the reaction coordinate which may aid hydrogen-transfer reactions. The roles of these comprehensive motions and the understanding of the structural origins to these motions were not previously researched, and indirect experimental evidence and computational simulations were used to aid provide the insight into these good vibrations or motions.

In 2015, Hay also participated in research which first published a paper on a new, soluble, oxygen tolerant reductive dehalogenase enzyme. Organohalides in general contribute to a large proportion of environmental pollutants and the enzyme reductive dehalogenase is responsible for the biological dehalogenation in organohalide respiring bacteria. However, some of these enzymes are usually membrane associated and oxygen sensitive and therefore inhibits the process of dehalogenation, which the enzyme published upon was able to overcome.

=== Awards and nominations ===
- BBSRC David Phillips fellowship (2010)
- Rita and John Cornforth Award (2009)

== Major publications ==
- Hay, Sam; Scrutton, Nigel S. (2012). "Good vibrations in enzyme-catalysed reactions". Nature Chemistry. 4 (3): 161–168. Bibcode:2012NatCh...4..161H. doi:10.1038/nchem.1223. PMID 22354429.
- Hay, Sam; Payne, Karl A. P.; Quezada, Carolina P.; Fisher, Karl; Dunstan, Mark S.; Collins, Fraser A.; Sjuts, Hanno; Levy, Colin; Rigby, Stephen E. J.; Leys, David (2015). "Reductive dehalogenase structure suggests a mechanism for B12-dependent dehalogenation". Nature. 517 (7535): 513–516. Bibcode:2015Natur.517..513P. doi:10.1038/nature13901. PMC 4968649. PMID 25327251.
- Hay, Sam; Payne, Karl A. P.; White, Mark D.; Fisher, Karl; Khara, Basile; Parker, David; Rattray, Nicholas J.; Trivedi, Drupad K.; Rigby, Stephen E. J.; Leys, David; Goodacre, Royston; Barran, Perdita; Beveridge, Rebecca; Scrutton, Nigel S. (2015). "New cofactor supports α,β-unsaturated acid decarboxylation via 1,3-dipolar cycloaddition". Nature. 522 (7557): 497–501. Bibcode:2015Natur.522..497P. doi:10.1038/nature14560. PMC 4988494. PMID 26083754.
- Hay, Sam; Scrutton, Nigel S.; Sutcliffe, Michael J. (2007). "Promoting motions in enzyme catalysis probed by pressure studies of kinetic isotope effects". PNAS. 104 (2): 507–512. Bibcode:2007PNAS..104..507H. doi:10.1073/pnas.0608408104. PMC 1766415. PMID 17202258.
- Hay, Sam; Payne, Karl A. P.; White, Mark D.; Fisher, Karl; Marshall, Stephen A.; Parker, David; Rattray, Nicholas J.; Trivedi, Drupad K.; Leys, David; Goodacre, Royston; Rigby, Stephen E. J.; Scrutton, Nigel S. (2015). "UbiX is a flavin prenyltransferase required for bacterial ubiquinone biosynthesis". Nature. 522 (7557): 502–506. Bibcode:2015Natur.522..502W. doi:10.1038/nature14559. PMC 4988493. PMID 26083743.
