= Douglas Philp =

Scottish chemist

Douglas Philp FRSE (born 31 December 1967) is a Scottish chemist who is currently Professor in Chemistry at the University of St Andrews. He was previously a Reader in Physical Organic Chemistry at the University of Birmingham.

Philp graduated from the University of Aberdeen with a BSc in Chemistry in 1989 and completed his PhD in 1992 at the University of Birmingham with a thesis entitled Self-Assembly in Chemical Systems.

He was awarded the Saltire Society Scottish Science Award in 2005 and the Royal Society of Chemistry Bader Award in 2009. He was made a Fellow of the Royal Society of Edinburgh in 2021.

Philp has an h-index of 48 according to Google Scholar.
