= SIRCAMS =

Scottish scientific facility

Coordinates: 55°55′25″N 3°10′34″W

The Scottish Instrumentation and Research Centre for Advanced Mass Spectrometry (SIRCAMS) is a facility for ultra-high resolution mass spectrometry of biomolecules. SIRCAMS is based in the University of Edinburgh School of Chemistry.

Much of the research activity is focused toward the development and application of mass spectrometry for the analysis of intact peptides, proteins, protein–protein, and protein–RNA/DNA complexes. Recent studies have included: identification of platination sites in peptides (bombesin, substance P, angiotensin, bradykinin) using Infrared multiphoton dissociation (IRMPD), Collision-induced dissociation (CID) and Electron-capture dissociation (ECD), accurate mass measurements on intact proteins (YdaE 6.5kDa, ubiquitin 8.6kDa, trypsinogen 24kDa, carbonic anhydrase 28kDa, beSOD 31kDa, FbpA 33kDa, BSA 66kDa) under native and denaturing conditions, identification of dynamic post-translational modifications in intact human histones using top-down ECD, top-down identification of proteins from complex mixtures, as well as accurate mass analysis of oligonucleotide DNA strands (40 bp).

The capital cost of FTICR instruments operating at field strengths higher than 9.4 T are such that few University institutions worldwide can offer access. SIRCAMS offers user access to a 12T Bruker SolariX FTICR mass spectrometer within the facility. By taking advantage of the research expertise that has been developed by staff within the facility, users have access to techniques for accurate mass measurement of intact proteins with isotope peak fitting, top-down protein sequencing from complex mixtures (such as biomarker identification) solution and gas-phase HDX for protein conformational studies, mapping of post-translational modifications in peptides and proteins, and identification of DNA modifications.
