= John Joule =

British academic and chemist

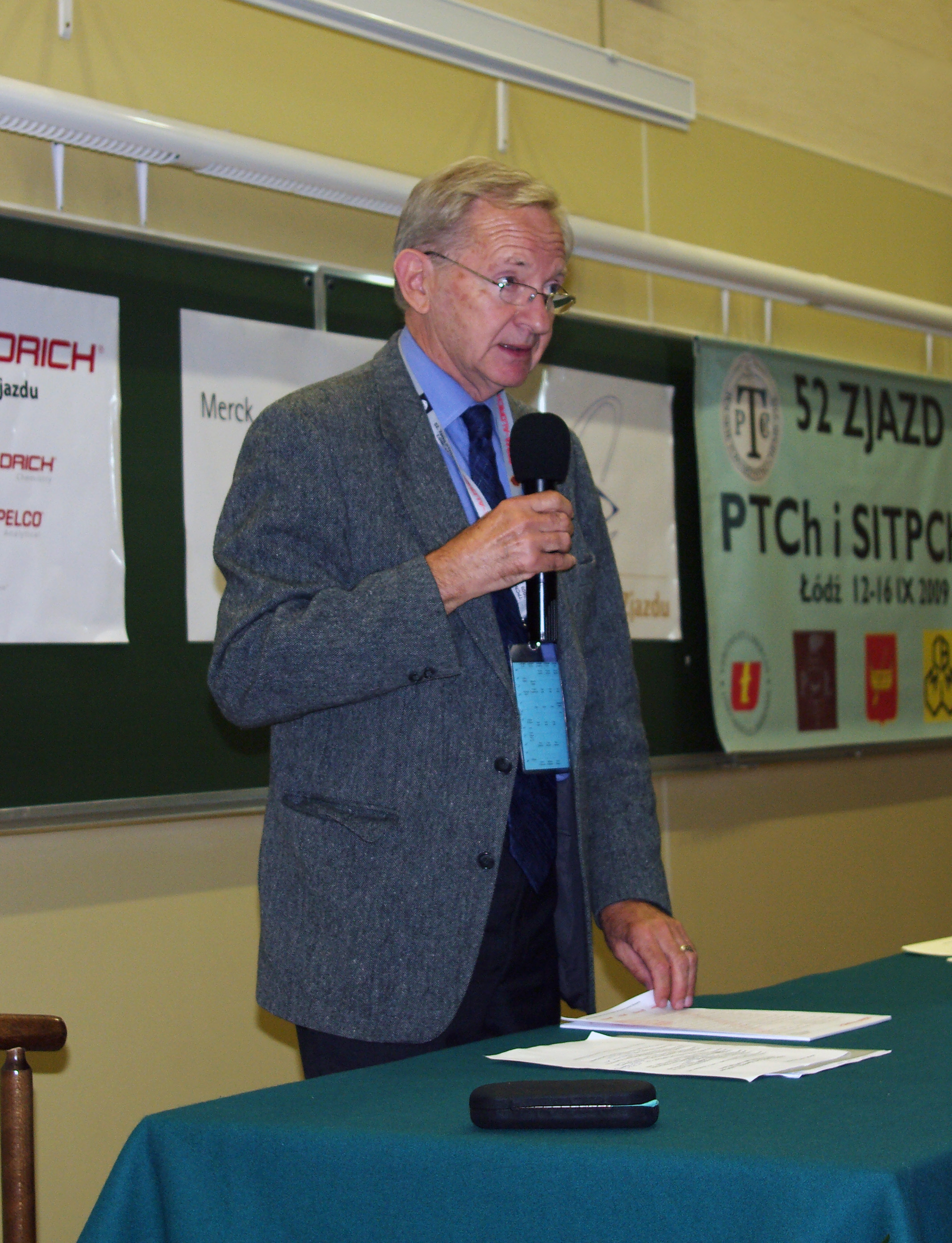
Professor John Joule speaking at 52nd Polish Chemical Society Congress on 12–16 September in Lodz, Poland

John Arthur Joule is a British academic and chemist. Joule took his BSc, MSc, and PhD degrees at the University of Manchester, obtaining his PhD (with George Smith) in 1961. He then undertook post-doctoral work at with Professor Richard K. Hill at Princeton University and Professor Carl Djerassi at Stanford University. In 1963 he joined the academic staff of the Chemistry Department at the University of Manchester, where he is currently an Emeritus Professor. In 1996 he received an RSC Medal for Heterocyclic Chemistry. In 2014, he received the Marie Curie Medal conferred by the Polish Chemical Society.

He co-wrote the textbook Heterocyclic Chemistry, initially with George Smith, but then with other authors in later editions.
