= Alison Hulme =

English chemist

- Education: University of Cambridge
- Scientific career
- Workplaces: University of Edinburgh; Colorado State University; University of Cambridge

Alison Hulme FRSE is an English chemist and Professor of Synthesis and Chemical Biology. Her research considers natural products and synthesis. She was elected Fellow of the Royal Society of Edinburgh and awarded the Royal Society of Chemistry Bader Award in 2021.

== Early life and education ==
Hulme became interested in chemistry as a child. Her grandfather was a metallurgist at Procter & Gamble and her mother was a high school biology teacher. She spent her childhood doing experiments at home, and particularly enjoyed being able to play with microscopes. She was a member of the UK team at the International Chemistry Olympiad.

Hulme eventually studied Natural Sciences at the University of Cambridge. After graduating in Hulme started a doctoral research programme with Ian Paterson. She worked as a research fellow with Albert I. Meyers at Colorado State University.

In 1994 Hulme returned to the University of Cambridge, where she was appointed a Hertha Ayrton Fellow at Girton College, Cambridge.

== Research and career ==
Hulme was appointed a lecturer at the University of Edinburgh, where she was promoted to a Personal Chair in 2017. Her research combines chemical biology and medical science to synthesise and make use of natural products.

Hulme was awarded the Royal Society of Chemistry Bader Award for her efforts in label-free Raman imaging. Label-free Raman imaging, or Stimulated Raman scattering, can be used to identify the location of drugs in biological cells. These imaging techniques can be used to diagnose and treat cancer, as well as improving pre-clinical modelling of drug candidates.

== Awards and honours ==
- 2015 Elected President of the Royal Society of Chemistry Organic Division Council
- 2021 Elected Fellow of the Royal Society of Edinburgh
- 2021 Royal Society of Chemistry Bader Award

== Select publications ==
- Ester S B Ferreira; Alison N Hulme; Hamish McNab; Anita Quye (5 July 2004). "The natural constituents of historical textile dyes". Chemical Society Reviews. 33 (6): 329–336. doi:10.1039/b305697j. ISSN 0306-0012. PMID 15280965. Wikidata Q34336910.
- Romain F H Viguier; Alison N. Hulme (1 September 2006). "A sensitized europium complex generated by micromolar concentrations of copper(I): toward the detection of copper(I) in biology". Journal of the American Chemical Society. 128 (35): 11370–11371. doi:10.1021/ja064232v. ISSN 0002-7863. PMID 16939257. Wikidata Q51139645.
- William J. Tipping; Martin Lee; A Serrels; V G Brunton; Alison N. Hulme (21 April 2016). "Stimulated Raman scattering microscopy: an emerging tool for drug discovery". Chemical Society Reviews. 45 (8): 2075–2089. doi:10.1039/c5cs00693g. ISSN 0306-0012. PMC 4839273. PMID 26839248. Wikidata Q28067096.
