= David Hodgson (chemist) =

British chemist

David Michael Hodgson is the Todd Fellow and Tutor in Chemistry at Oriel College, Oxford.

Hodgson achieved his Bachelor of Science at the University of Bath and gained his Doctor of Philosophy from the University of Southampton. His research interests are in synthesis, broadly encompassing studies directed towards the design and development of new methods, reagents and strategies for the synthesis of biologically active molecules.

== Publications ==
- Hodgson, David M.; Strat, Frederic Le (2004). "Use of allene in 1,3-dipolar addition to a carbonyl ylide: syntheses of 3-hydroxy-cis-nemorensic acid and nemorensic acid". Chemical Communications (7). Royal Society of Chemistry (RSC): 822–823. doi:10.1039/b316908a. ISSN 1359-7345. PMID 15045081.
- Hodgson, David M.; Bray, Christopher D.; Kindon, Nicholas D. (12 May 2004). "Enamines from Terminal Epoxides and Hindered Lithium Amides". Journal of the American Chemical Society. 126 (22). American Chemical Society (ACS): 6870–6871. doi:10.1021/ja031770o. ISSN 0002-7863. PMID 15174848.
- Hodgson, David M.; Brückl, Tobias; Glen, Rebecca; Labande, Agnès H.; Selden, Deborah A.; Dossetter, Alexander G.; Redgrave, Alison J. (22 March 2004). "Catalytic enantioselective intermolecular cycloadditions of 2-diazo-3,6-diketoester-derived carbonyl ylides with alkene dipolarophiles". Proceedings of the National Academy of Sciences. 101 (15): 5450–5454. doi:10.1073/pnas.0307274101. ISSN 0027-8424. PMC 397403. PMID 15037752.
- 'Intramolecular Cyclopropanation of Unsaturated Terminal Epoxides' D. M. Hodgson, Y. K. Chung and J.-M. Paris, J. Am. Chem. Soc., 2004, 126, 8664.
- Hodgson, David M.; Štefane, Bogdan; Miles, Timothy J.; Witherington, Jason (2004). "Unsaturated 1,2-amino alcohols and ethers from aziridines and organolithiums". Chem. Commun. (19). Royal Society of Chemistry (RSC): 2234–2235. doi:10.1039/b409486g. ISSN 1359-7345. PMID 15467888.
- Hodgson, David M.; Fleming, Matthew J.; Stanway, Steven J. (11 September 2004). "Alkenes from Terminal Epoxides Using Lithium 2,2,6,6-Tetramethylpiperidide and Organolithiums or Grignard Reagents". Journal of the American Chemical Society. 126 (39). American Chemical Society (ACS): 12250–12251. doi:10.1021/ja045513a. ISSN 0002-7863. PMID 15453742.
