= Department of Chemistry, University of Manchester =

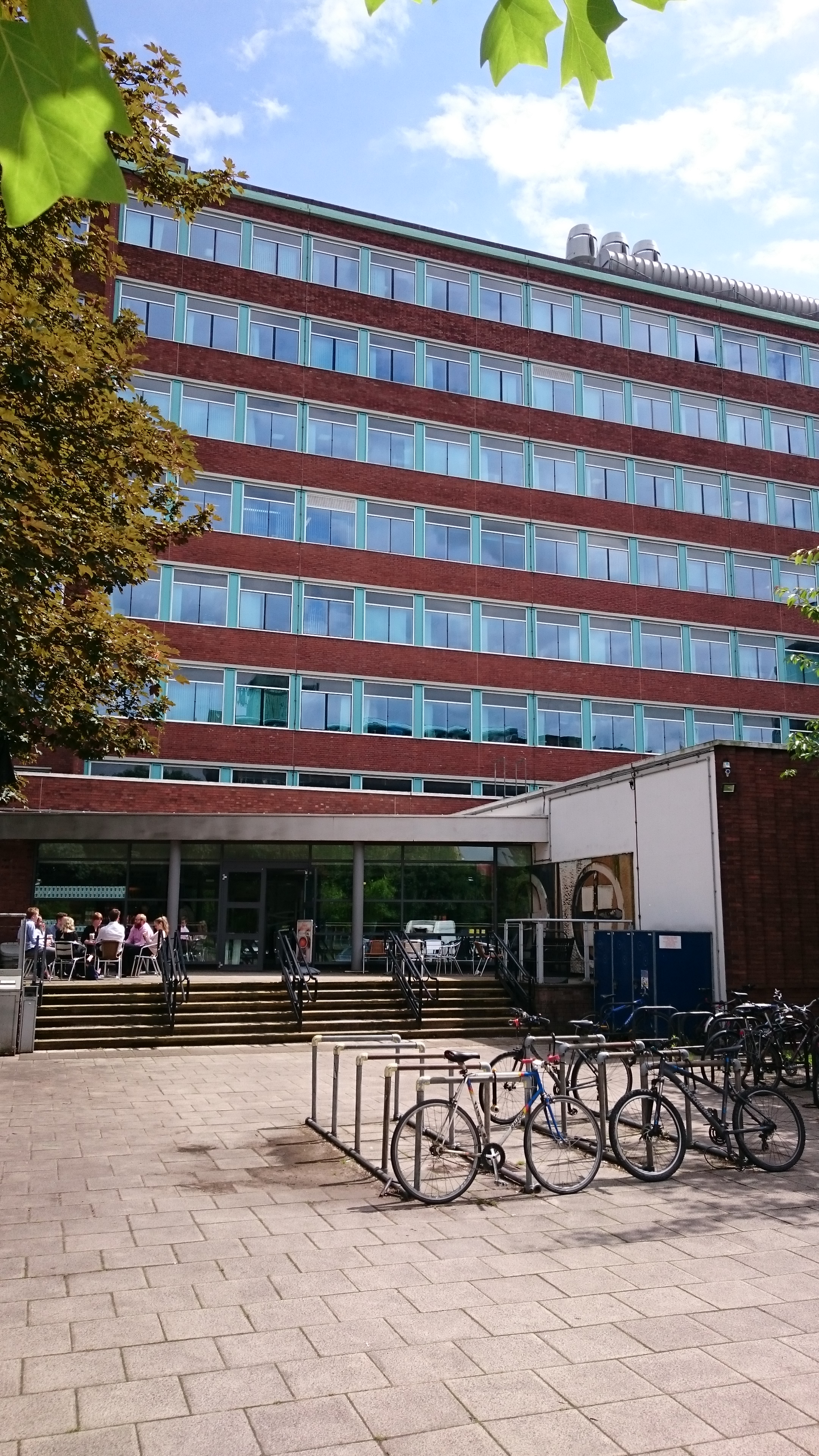
- The School of Chemistry from Brunswick Park
- Affiliations: Faculty of Science and Engineering; University of Manchester
- Director: David Procter
- Location: Manchester, United Kingdom
- Website: www.chemistry.manchester.ac.uk

The Department of Chemistry at the University of Manchester is one of the largest departments of Chemistry in the United Kingdom, with over 600 undergraduate and more than 200 postgraduate research students.

The department has comprehensive academic coverage across the chemical sciences and in all the core sub-disciplines of chemistry, with over 120 postdoctoral researchers.

== Current Management Board ==
- Head of Department: David Procter
- Head of Education: Alan Brisdon
- Undergraduate Program Director: Andrew Regan
- Subject Lead (Inorganic): David Collison
- Subject Lead (Organic): Andrew Regan
- Subject Lead (Physical): Nick Lockyer
- Head of Teaching and Scholarship: Jenny Slaughter
- PASS Management Staff: Nicholas Weise
- Undergraduate Admissions Tutor: Sam Hay
- International Studies: Lu Shin Wong

== Notable faculty ==
As of 2017, the department employs 34 full-time Professors and 11 Emeritus Professors, including:

- David Procter, Head of Department, and Professor of Organic Chemistry.
- Richard Winpenny, Ex-Head of School, and Professor of Inorganic Chemistry.
- David Leigh, FRS, Sir Samuel Hall Chair of Chemistry
- Gareth A. Morris, FRS, Professor of Physical Chemistry
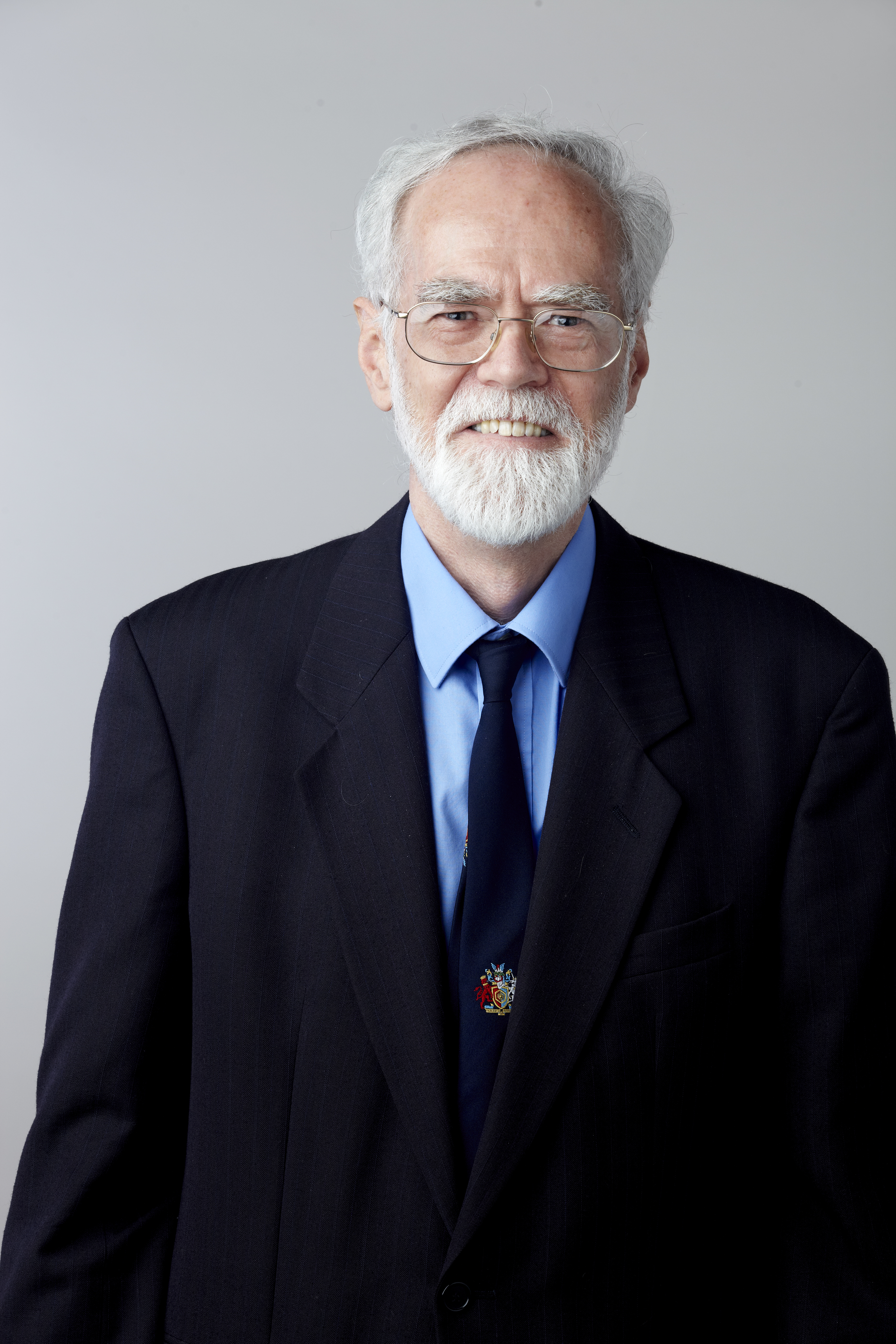
Gareth A. Morris is a Professor of Physical Chemistry in the School and a Fellow of the Royal Society (FRS)

=== Emeritus ===
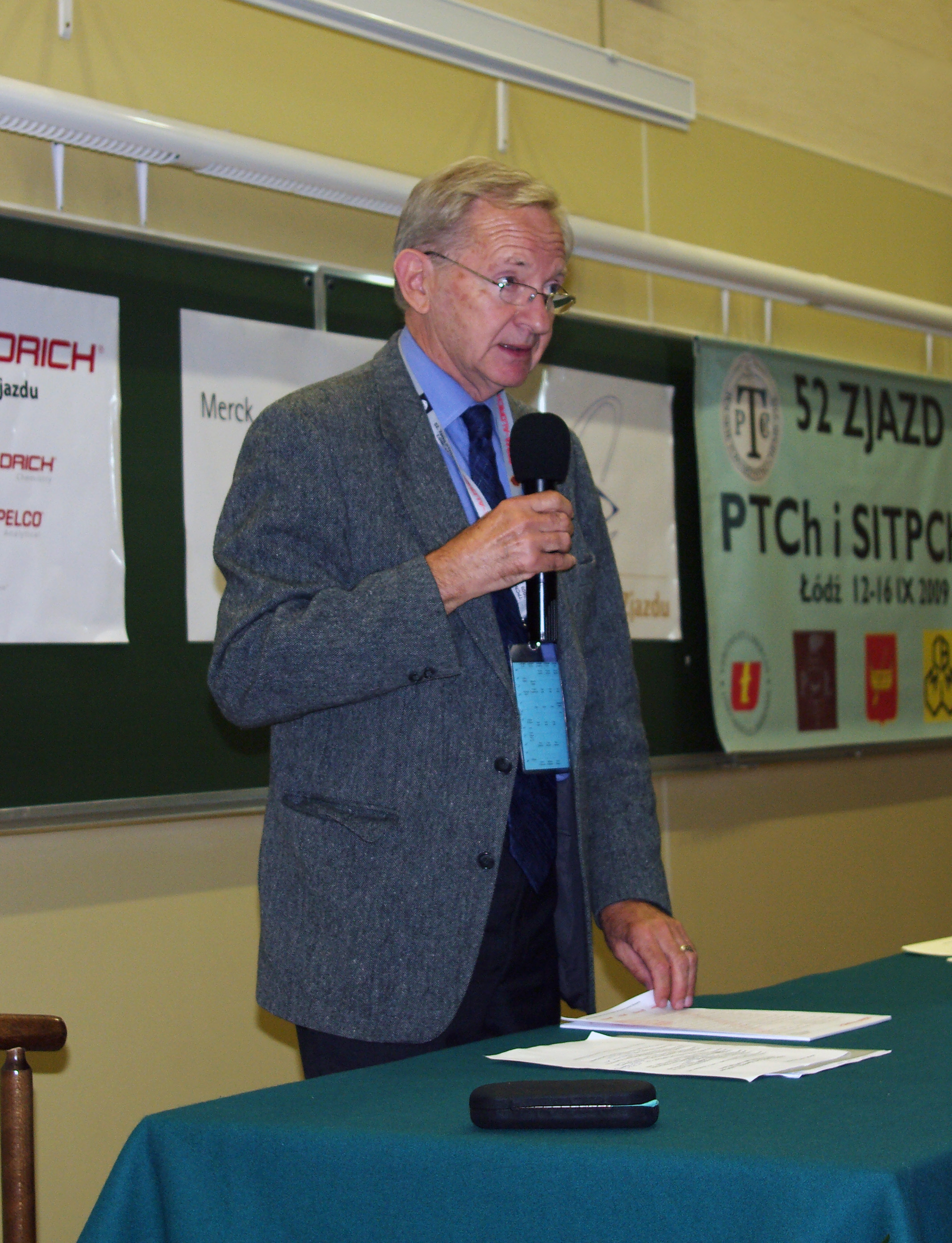
John Joule is an Emeritus Professor in the School of Chemistry

The School is also home to a number of Emeritus Professors, pursuing their research interests after their formal retirement, including:

- John Joule, Emeritus Professor

== History of chemistry in Manchester ==
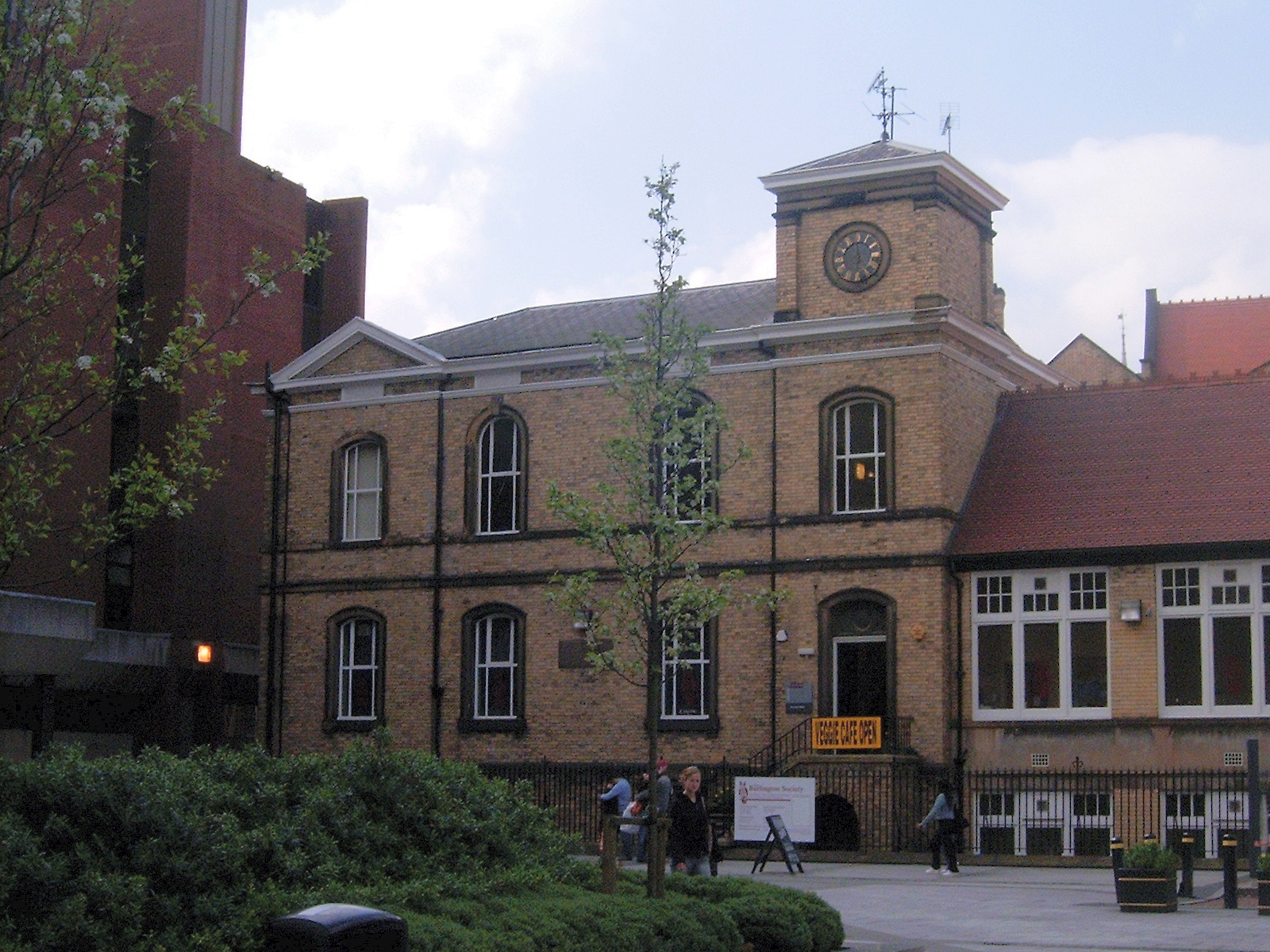
The Schunck Building, University of Manchester

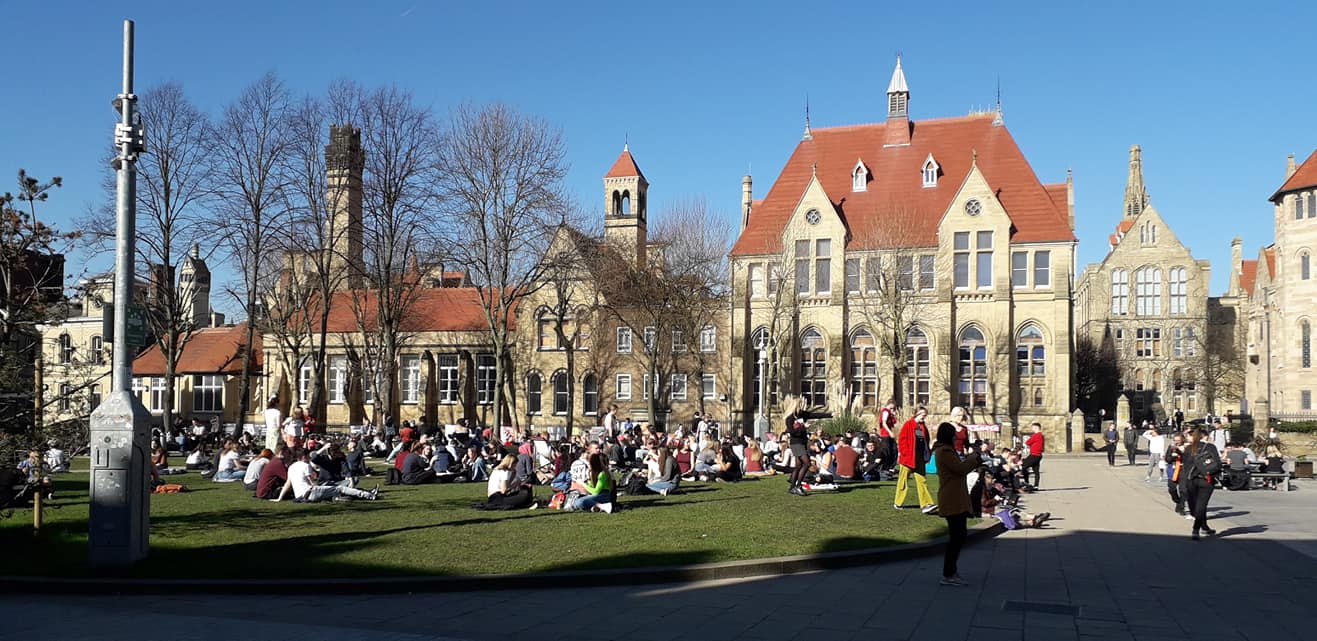
Four of the former chemical laboratories of the Victoria University of Manchester are shown here: Schunck, Perkin and Dalton (1904; left) and Roscoe (1873, centre); the taller building is the John Owens Building, also 1873

Manchester has a long and distinguished history of Chemistry. John Dalton founded modern Chemistry in 1803 with his atomic theory. William Henry (1774 – 1836) was a Manchester chemist who developed what is known today as Henry's Law. James Joule pioneered the science of thermodynamics in the 1840s while working in Manchester. In the basement of the Royal Manchester Institution, a laboratory was installed by Lyon Playfair, who worked there briefly as Professor of Chemistry after he left Thomson's of Clitheroe. He was succeeded by Frederick Crace Calvert, who made phenol, which was used by Joseph Lister as an antiseptic. Carl Schorlemmer, was appointed the first UK Professor of Organic Chemistry in 1874.

The teaching of chemistry in Owens College began in 1851 in a house in St John Street and was later transferred to the main college building in Quay Street. When the college moved again to the present university site in 1873, the chemical laboratory was designed by Henry Roscoe. To this was added in 1895 the Schorlemmer laboratory for organic chemistry, and in 1904, three more laboratories were added; these were the Dalton and Perkin laboratories and the Schunck laboratory, which was brought from Kersal and rebuilt. The Morley laboratories (1909) provided further accommodation for organic chemistry. In October 1909, Rona Robinson and two other women were arrested for dressing in full academic regalia and interrupting a speech by the chancellor of the university at the celebration of the opening of the new chemical laboratories. They were demanding that the chancellor speak out against the force-feeding of imprisoned suffragette alumni of Manchester who were on hunger strike. The police were particularly rough with the women that day and the chancellor was sufficiently moved by the women's protest to pressure the university into not pressing charges, thus preventing Rona from going to prison again.

After the 2nd World War three more laboratories were built further down Burlington Street; these were the Dixon Laboratory (1946), the Robinson Laboratory (1950), and the Lapworth Laboratory (1950); all three were vacated in the 1960s when the present building in Brunswick Street was available. The architect for the present chemistry building was H. S. Fairhurst & Son.

=== Professors ===
Professors at Owens College and the Victoria University of Manchester:

- Edward Frankland, 1851–57
- Henry E. Roscoe, 1857–86
- Carl Schorlemmer, 1874–92 (organic chemistry)
- Harold B. Dixon, 1887–1922
- William H. Perkin, 1892–1912 (organic chemistry)
- Arthur Lapworth, 1913–35 (organic chemistry)
- Robert Robinson, 1923–28 (organic chemistry)
- Ian Heilbron, 1933–38 (organic chemistry)
- Michael Polanyi, 1933–48 (physical chemistry)
- Alexander R. Todd, 1938–44 (organic chemistry)
- Edmund Hirst, 1945–47 (organic chemistry)
- Ewart Jones, 1947–54 (organic chemistry)
- Meredith G. Evans, 1948–52

=== Alumni ===
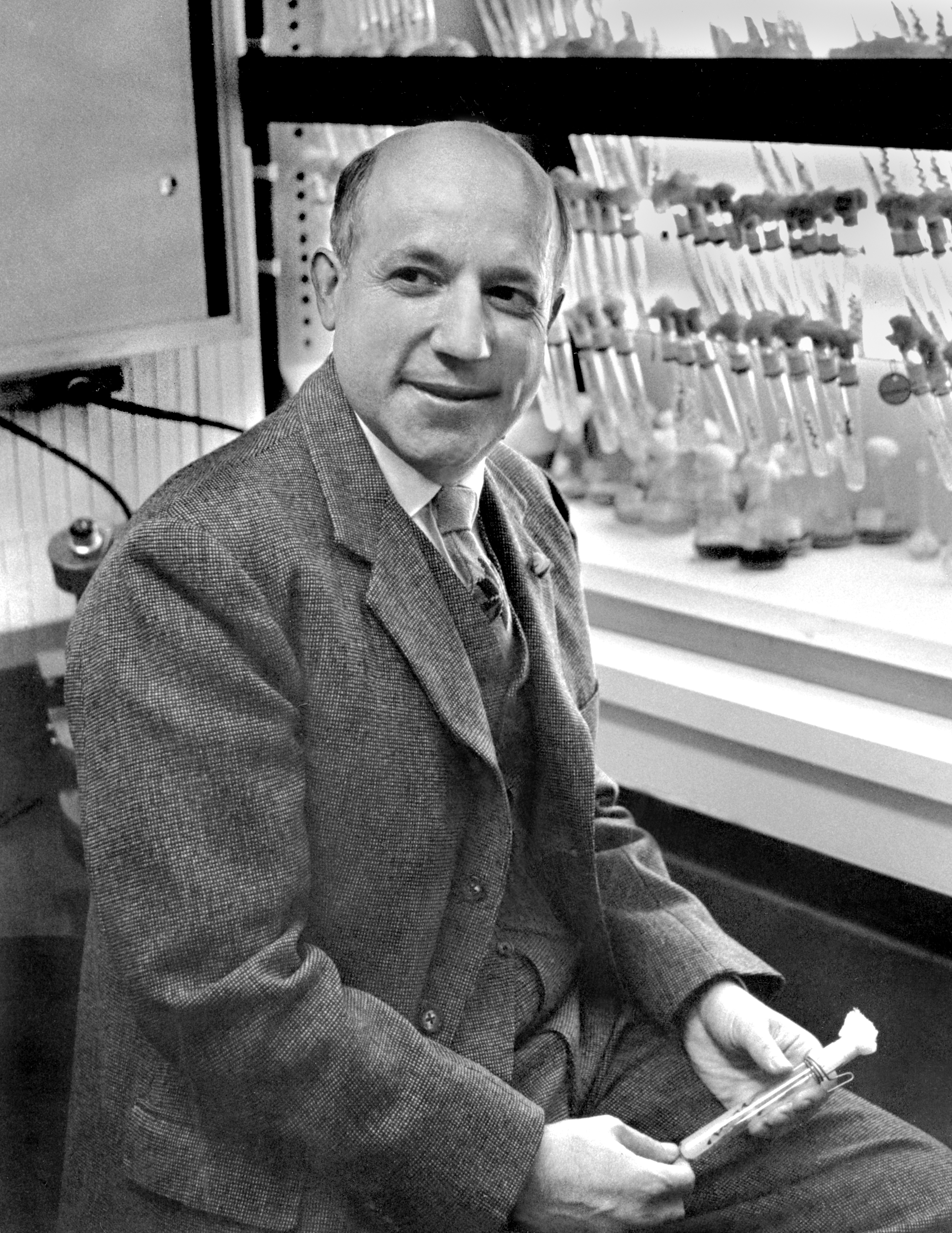
Melvin Calvin completed his PhD in the School of Chemistry and was awarded the Nobel Prize in Chemistry in 1961

Other distinguished alumni and former staff from the school of Chemistry include:

- Melvin Calvin, awarded the Nobel Prize in Chemistry in 1961
- Michael Polanyi, Professor of Chemistry
- Arthur Harden, awarded the Nobel Prize in Chemistry in 1929
- Norman Haworth, awarded the Nobel Prize in Chemistry in 1937
- George de Hevesy, awarded the Nobel Prize in Chemistry in 1943
- James Lovelock FRS, undergraduate in Chemistry, graduating in 1941
- John Charles Polanyi, awarded the Nobel Prize in Chemistry in 1986
- Robert Robinson, awarded the Nobel Prize in Chemistry in 1947
- Ernest Rutherford, awarded the Nobel Prize in Chemistry in 1908
- Michael Smith, completed a PhD in Manchester, awarded the Nobel Prize in Chemistry in 1993
- Alexander R. Todd, Baron Todd, awarded the Nobel Prize in Chemistry in 1957

See also Notable chemists (and biologists) at the University of Manchester
