= Perdita Barran =

English chemist

- Born: Perdita Elizabeth Barran
- Education: Godolphin and Latymer School
- Alma mater: University of Manchester (BSc); University of Sussex (PhD)
- Scientific career
- Fields: Chemistry; Biomarkers; Parkinson's disease Mass spectrometry Ion-mobility spectrometry–mass spectrometry
- Workplaces: University of Manchester; University of Edinburgh; University of California, Santa Barbara
- Thesis: Studies of refractory clusters produced from a pulsed arc source (1998)
- Website: www.research.manchester.ac.uk/portal/perdita.barran.html

Perdita Elizabeth Barran is a Professor of Mass Spectrometry at the University of Manchester. She is Director of the Michael Barber Centre for Collaborative Mass Spectrometry. She develops and applies ion-mobility spectrometry–mass spectrometry to the study of molecule structure and is searching for biomarkers for Parkinson's disease. She is Associate Dean for Research Facility Development at the University of Manchester. In 2020 and 2021 she was seconded to work for the Department of Health and Social Care as an advisor on the use case for mass spectrometry as a diagnostic method for diagnosis of COVID infection.

== Education and early career ==
Barran went to Godolphin and Latymer School. She moved to the University of Manchester to study chemistry, graduating in 1994. She joined the University of Sussex for her graduate studies, working with Harry Kroto and Tony Stace.

== Research and career ==
Barran stayed with Stace for three years after completing her PhD in 1998. In 2001 Barran joined the University of California, Santa Barbara, working as a postdoctoral fellow with Mike Bowers. She was interested in the structure and stability of small molecules in the gas phase. She looked at how Ion-mobility spectrometry could be used to identify conformation.

Barran joined the University of Edinburgh as an Engineering and Physical Sciences Research Council (EPSRC) Advanced Research Fellow in 2002. In 2005 she was awarded the 10th Desty Memorial prize for her innovations in Separation Science. She was made a Senior Lecturer in 2009. She worked on mass spectrometry techniques that can be used to evaluate conformational change, aggregation and intrinsic conformation. She investigated mass spectrometry for therapeutics for pre-fibrillar aggregation. She helped to establish the Scottish Instrumentation and Resource Centre for Advanced Mass Spectrometry at the University of Edinburgh. This had an initial remit to provide proteomic analysis for the MRC Human Genetics Unit.

In 2013 Barran was appointed to the Manchester Institute of Biotechnology as a Chair in Mass Spectrometry sponsored by Waters Corporation. She led an EPSRC platform grant to study the structure-activity relationships of Beta defensins. She works with Cait MacPhee, Garth Cooper and Tilo Kunath on neurodegenerative proteins, and with several groups including Richard Kriwacki, Rohit Pappu and Gary Daughdrill to examine intrinsically disordered proteins. She works with several biopharmaceutical companies to apply new mass spectrometry techniques to new drug modalities including monoclonal antibodies. She also develops new mass spectrometry instrumentation. Her group looks at the structure of biological systems at a molecular level, studying them in the gas and solution phase as well as theoretically. They use electrospray ionization, mass spectrometry, ion mobility mass spectrometry native mass spectrometry and complementary solution based biophysical techniques. They are interested in a proteins structure and how it changes in an effort to relate that to their function. Ion-mobility spectrometry–mass spectrometry can be used to look at the temperature dependent rotationally averaged collision cross-section of gas-phase ions of proteins. In 2014 she was awarded a Biotechnology and Biological Sciences Research Council grant to study the interactions of proteins with other proteins. Barran serves on the editorial board of the International Journal of Mass Spectrometry. She was included in the page of Perditas created by Perdita Stevens.

=== Parkinson's disease ===
Barran has been working with Joy Milne to search for odorous biomarkers of Parkinson's disease. By smelling skin swabs, Milne says she can differentiate between people with and without Parkinson's disease. She says she identified changes in her husband's scent before he was formally diagnosed with Parkinson's disease, which he died of in 2015. Barran uses mass spectrometry to investigate the biomarkers of Parkinson's disease. The story was made into a BBC documentary The Woman Who Can Smell Parkinson's. Barran received ethical approval for her work of the skin metabolites of Parkinson's in 2015, allowing them to work with Parkinson's UK to conduct a larger study. In 2018 Milne travelled to the Tanzanian training centre APOPO to check whether she could smell Tuberculosis. Barran's work on Parkinson's is sponsored by The Michael J. Fox Foundation.

In 2022, Barran and others published a study of a method to detect Parkinson's disease by analysing sebum using mass spectrometry.

== Awards ==
Barran was awarded the 2009 Joseph Black award, and the 2020 Theophillus Redwood Award from the Royal Society of Chemistry Analytical Division. Along with a team of researchers 'NosetoDiagnose' she won the Horizon Prize from the Royal Society of Chemistry 2021. She is ranked #3 in the "Human Health Heroes" field on the 2024 Analytical Scientist Power List. In 2025, she won the Royal Society of Chemistry Tilden Prize for Outstanding Contributions to Chemistry Research.
