= Fiona Meldrum =

British chemist

- Born: Fiona C. Meldrum
- Education: University of Cambridge (BA); University of Bath (PhD)
- Scientific career
- Fields: Crystallization; Calcium carbonate Mineralization
- Workplaces: University of Leeds; Queen Mary, University of London; Australian National University; Max Planck Institute for Polymer Research; Syracuse University
- Thesis: Nanoscale synthesis in organised organic assemblies (1992)
- Website: eps.leeds.ac.uk/chemistry/staff/4202/professor-fiona-meldrum

Fiona C. Meldrum is a British scientist who is a Professor of Inorganic Chemistry at the University of Leeds where she works on bio-inspired materials and crystallisation processes. She won the 2017 Royal Society of Chemistry Interdisciplinary Prize.

== Education ==
Meldrum studied the Natural Sciences Tripos at the University of Cambridge, graduating in 1989. She joined the University of Bath for her postgraduate studies, working on bio-inspired systems where she completed her PhD on nanoscale synthesis in 1992.

== Career and research ==
Meldrum was appointed a postdoctoral research fellow at Syracuse University, where she worked on nanoparticle assembly with Janos Fendler. Whilst there, she contributed to the book Biomimetic Materials Chemistry.

Meldrum was a Humboldt Research Fellow at the Max Planck Institute for Polymer Research, working on crystallisation using surface plasmon spectroscopy with Wolfgang Knoll. She explored chemical deposition of PbS on gold using self-assembled monolayers. Following this position, she worked at the Australian National University on biomineralisation.

Meldrum joined Queen Mary University of London as a lecturer in 1998. She moved to the University of Bristol in 2003, where she established new techniques to control crystal morphologies. In 2009 Meldrum was appointed as a Professor at the University of Leeds.

Meldrum was awarded an Engineering and Physical Sciences Research Council Fellowship in 2010. Her fellowship considers confined crystallisation in biological systems. She studied the crystallisation of calcium carbonate and calcium phosphate and their behaviour in confined systems. She demonstrated that confinement slows crystallisation, stabilising metaphases. Confined crystallisation can be used to control the polycrystalline structure of crystals. Supported by the Leverhulme Trust, Meldrum showed that even nanoscale confinement can template crystallisation. Meldrum looks to use biology to guide crystal growth, demonstrating precipitation with mould and via an amorphous precursor phase. She also looked how water-soluble block copolymers can influence the crystallisation of barium sulfate and calcium carbonate.

Meldrum's work uses nature as an inspiration for materials design. She focuses on biominerals such as bones, teeth and shells. She monitors the amorphous and precursor phases of biological crystal formation. Meldrum uses nanoparticles as additives in crystal growth, using the particle surface chemistry to tune particle occlusion. Amongst several organic additives, Meldrum has incorporated amino acids into calcite. The choice of additive is guided by genetic algorithms, resulting in the production of crystals with desired properties. She has evaluated how the surface topography impacts ice crystallisation, showing acute geometries give rise to a confined crystalline, which is followed by the formation of a bulk phase.

The Meldrum group develop microfluidic devices to monitor crystallisation processes. Crystallisation is usually difficult to monitor, as precipitation occurs very rapidly and is severely impacted by impurities. Microfluidic devices offer more control of the crystallisation rate, providing reproducible conditions for crystal growth and the potential to analyse the growth in situ. Meldrum developed a Crystal Hotel to study crystallisation in a variety of environments and equilibrium conditions. Meldrum has developed a range of experimental techniques; including Bragg coherent diffraction imaging, Brewster angle microscopy, liquid-cell Atomic force microscopy (AFM) and Infrared spectroscopy.

=== Awards and honours ===
Meldrum was appointed lead editor of the Materials Research Society (MRS) Bulletin in 2016. In 2017, she was awarded the Royal Society of Chemistry Interdisciplinary Prize. She was awarded a European Research Council (ERC) advanced grant in 2018.
