= Guy Lloyd-Jones =

British chemist

Guy Charles Lloyd-Jones
- Born: 17 May 1966 (age 60); London, England
- Education: Huddersfield Polytechnic; Linacre College, Oxford
- Known for: Reaction mechanisms in organometallic chemistry and catalysis
- Awards: Fellow of the Royal Society (2013)
- Scientific career
- Fields: Chemistry
- Workplaces: University of Edinburgh; University of Bristol; University of Oxford; Huddersfield Polytechnic
- Thesis: Catalytic hydrometallation (1993)
- Doctoral advisor: John M. Brown
- Website: www.lloyd-jones.chem.ed.ac.uk royalsociety.org/people/guy-lloyd-jones chem.ed.ac.uk/staff/academic/lloyd-jones.html

Guy Charles Lloyd-Jones FRS FRSE (born 17 May 1966) is a British chemist. He is the Forbes Professor of Organic Chemistry at the University of Edinburgh in the United Kingdom. His research is largely concerned with the determination of organometallic reaction mechanisms, especially those of palladium-catalyzed coupling reactions such as Suzuki-Miyaura coupling.

== Biography ==
Lloyd-Jones received a Bachelor of Science degree from Huddersfield Polytechnic in 1989, and a DPhil from the University of Oxford in 1992. He was a Royal Society Western European postdoctoral research fellow at Basel University from 1993 to 1995 with Professor Andreas Pfaltz. He joined the University of Bristol as a lecturer in 1996, before being promoted to reader in 2000, professor in 2003 and Head of Organic and Biological Chemistry in 2012. In 2013, he moved to the University of Edinburgh to take up the Forbes Chair of Organic Chemistry.

Lloyd-Jones's work has been recognised by awards such as the RSC's Hickinbottom Fellowship (2000), the German Chemical Society's Liebig Lectureship (2003), the RSC Corday–Morgan Medal (2003), the RSC Organic Reaction Mechanisms Prize (2007), the GSK/AZ/Pfizer/Syngenta UK Prize for Process Chemistry Research (2010), a Royal Society Wolfson Research Merit Award (2008–2013) and the RSC Physical Organic Chemistry Medal and Ingold Lectureship (2013). Professor Lloyd-Jones was elected a Fellow of the Royal Society in 2013 and a Fellow of the Royal Society of Edinburgh in 2015.
