= Perdita Huston =

Perdita Constance Huston (May 2, 1936 – December 4, 2001) was an American journalist and women's rights activist. She is commemorated by the international Perdita Huston Human Rights Award.

Born in Portland, Maine, Huston studied in France and later worked in Africa. She was director of public affairs for TIME magazine in French-speaking countries, and in 1978 became a Regional Director of the Peace Corps. Her first book "Message from the Village" was also published in 1978.

She later worked for the World Conservation Union (IUCN) in Switzerland and at the International Planned Parenthood Federation (IPPF) in London and acted as consultant with UNDP, UNIFEM, UNFPA and UNICEF. From 1997, she returned to work for the Peace Corps as a Country Director in Mali and then Bulgaria.

The Perdita Huston Human Rights Award is supported by the Washington D.C. chapter of the United Nations Association of the United States of America. The awardees include 2003 - Sima Samar 2004 - Madame Fatumata Traore 2005 - Ms. Ranjana Gaur 2006 - Sunitha Krishnan 2007 - Zipporah Sein, Bishnu Pariyar, and Samar Minallah 2011- Zainab Salbi

== Books ==
- Message from the Village, Epoch B Foundation, 1978 ISBN 0-931730-01-5
- Third World Women Speak Out, Praeger Publishers, 1979 ASIN B000GWIA8Q
- The Right to Choose, Earthscan Publications, 1992 ISBN 1-85383-123-9
- Motherhood by Choice: Pioneers in Women's Health and Family Planning, The Feminist Press 1992 ISBN 1-55861-069-3
- Families As We Are, The Feminist Press, 2001 ISBN 1-55861-250-5 - see also
