= David Leigh (scientist) =

British chemist (born 1963)

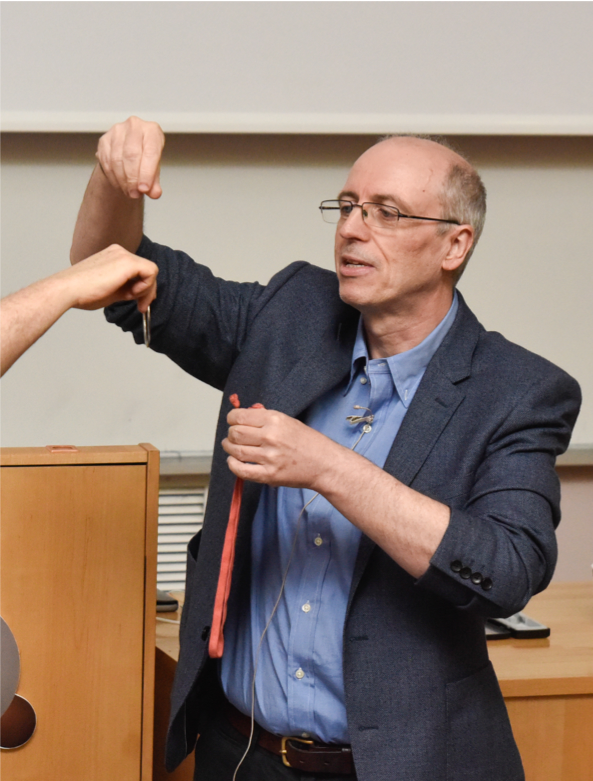
- Leigh in 2019
- Born: David Alan Leigh; 31 May 1963 (age 63); Birmingham, UK
- Education: University of Sheffield (BSc, PhD)
- Known for: Catenanes, Rotaxanes, Molecular knots, Molecular machines
- Awards: FRS (2009); FRSE (2005); Feynman Prize (2007); Izatt-Christensen Award (2007); Perkin Prize (2017); Royal Society Bakerian Medal (2013); Royal Society of Edinburgh Royal Medal (2021); GDCh August Wilhelm von Hofmann Medal (2024); International Solvay Chair in Chemistry (2028)
- Scientific career
- Fields: Supramolecular chemistry Organic chemistry
- Workplaces: University of Manchester; University of Edinburgh; University of Warwick
- Thesis: The synthesis and properties of novel and natural macrocyclic trichothecenes (1987)
- Website: catenane.net

David Alan Leigh (born 31 May 1963) FRS FRSE FRSC is a British chemist, Royal Society Research Professor and, since 2014, the Sir Samuel Hall Chair of Chemistry in the Department of Chemistry at the University of Manchester. He was previously the Forbes Chair of Organic Chemistry at the University of Edinburgh (2001–2012) and Professor of Synthetic Chemistry at the University of Warwick (1998–2001). He is President-elect of the Royal Society of Chemistry (2026–28; President 2028–2030).

== Education ==
Leigh was educated at Codsall Community High School and the University of Sheffield.

== Career and research ==
He is noted for the invention of fundamental methods to control molecular-level dynamics and entanglement. His group's experimental designs established Brownian ratchet mechanisms as a general principle for achieving directionality, transport, energy transduction and function in chemical systems far from equilibrium. Key advances include catalysis-driven (autonomous) chemically fueled systems, molecular assembly, entanglement and weaving, novel and general strategies to rotaxanes, catenanes and molecular knots, and some of the earliest synthetic molecular motors, molecular robots and functional nanomachines.

Using mechanically-interlocked molecular architectures he prepared a novel molecular information ratchet that employs a mechanism reminiscent of Maxwell's demon (although it requires an energy input and so does not challenge the second law of thermodynamics). He has developed a rotaxane based photoactive molecular switch with the capability of changing the hydrophobicity of a surface and thus causing small droplets of liquid to move up hill, against the force of gravity. In 2009 he reported the first small-molecule walker-track system in which a 'walker' can be transported directionally along a short molecular track in a manner reminiscent of the way that biological motor proteins 'walk' along biopolymers in the cell. In 2011 his research group described the smallest molecular knot prepared to date (a 76-atom-loop trefoil knot – three crossing points) and also a 160-atom-loop pentafoil knot (five crossing points). The Leigh group have also reported the synthesis of an 8_{19} knot, the most complex molecular knot made to date, and a molecular endless knot (the smallest Chinese knot). In 2013 the Leigh group reported a small-molecule machine capable of detaching and assembling a series of amino acid building blocks from a track into a peptide of specific sequence, a very primitive version of the task performed by the ribosome. They also invented the first autonomous chemically-fuelled synthetic molecular motor and demonstrated a small-molecule 'robotic arm' able to transport molecular fragments between sites 2 nm apart on a molecular platform, marking the start of so-called 'small-molecule robotics'. In 2017 the Leigh group reported the first molecular robot that can be programmed to build different molecules. The molecular robot could be programmed to construct any one of four different stereoisomers of a molecular product, a significant step towards a 'molecular assembler'. The achievement was hailed as 'science fiction becomes fact'. In 2020 the Leigh group described the 2D weaving of polymer chains, resulting in a molecularly-woven fabric with a thread count of 40-60 million (the finest Egyptian linen has a thread count of ~1500).

In September 2016 Leigh was suggested as one of three candidates for the potential award of a Nobel Prize for synthetic molecular machines. However, on 5 October 2016 the Nobel Prize in Chemistry was awarded to J. Fraser Stoddart, Ben Feringa and Jean-Pierre Sauvage for the design and synthesis of molecular machines.

== Public engagement ==
Leigh's 8_{19} molecular knot features in the 2019 Guinness Book of World Records. In 2018 he commissioned 'Nanobot', a parody by acapellascience of 'Havana' by Camila Cabello, describing the science behind nanorobotics. The 'Professor David Leigh Prize for Chemistry' at Codsall Community High School encourages girls and disadvantaged children to study science at university. Leigh is a Director and Governor of Withington Girls' School.

Leigh is a former national champion contract bridge player and an accomplished magician (ex-Edinburgh Magic Circle and the Manchester Circle of Magicians), known for blending magic and science in his public lectures.

== Awards and honours ==
- Royal Society of Chemistry Award for Supramolecular Chemistry (2003)
- Fellow of the Royal Society of Chemistry (2004)
- Institute of Chemistry of Ireland Annual Award for Chemistry (2005)
- Fellow of the Royal Society of Edinburgh (2005)
- Royal Society-Wolfson Research Merit Award (2005)
- EPSRC Senior Research Fellow (2005–2010)
- Royal Society of Chemistry Award for Nanotechnology (2005)
- Royal Society of Chemistry-Real Sociedad Española de Química (RSC-RSEQ) Prize for Chemistry (2007)
- International Izatt-Christensen Award in Macrocyclic Chemistry (2007)
- Foresight Nanotech Institute Feynman Prize (Theory) (2007)
- EU Descartes Prize for Research (2007)
- European Research Council Advanced Grants (2008 [inaugural call], 2013 and 2017)
- Fellow of the Royal Society (2009)
- Royal Society of Chemistry Merck Award (2009)
- Royal Society of Chemistry Tilden Prize (2010)
- Royal Society Bakerian Medal (2013)
- Royal Society of Chemistry Pedler Award (2014)
- Academia Europaea (2015)
- Royal Society Research Professor (2016)
- Royal Society of Chemistry Perkin Prize for Organic Chemistry (2017)
- International Society for Nanoscale Science, Computation and Engineering Nanoscience Prize (2019)
- Royal Medal, Royal Society of Edinburgh (2021)
- August Wilhelm von Hofmann Medal, GDCh (2024)
- Ronald Breslow Award for Achievement in Biomimetic Chemistry, American Chemical Society (2026)
- International Solvay Chair in Chemistry (2028)
