= Perdita Stevens =

British mathematician and computer scientist

Perdita Emma Stevens (born 1966) is a British mathematician, theoretical computer scientist, and software engineer who holds a personal chair in the mathematics of software engineering as part of the School of Informatics at the University of Edinburgh. Her research includes work on model-driven engineering, including model transformation, model checking, and the Unified Modeling Language.

== Education and career ==
Stevens read mathematics at the University of Cambridge, earning a bachelor's degree in 1987. She went to the University of Warwick for graduate study in abstract algebra, earning a master's degree in 1988 and completing a PhD in 1992. Her doctoral dissertation, Integral Forms for Weyl Modules of $\mathrm{GL}(2,\mathrm{Q})$, was supervised by Sandy Green.

After working in industry as a software engineer, Stevens joined the Department of Computer Science at the University of Edinburgh in 1984. She became a reader there in 2003 and in 2014 was given a personal chair as Professor of Mathematics of Software Engineering.

== Books ==
Stevens is the author of books including:

- Using UML: Software Engineering with Objects and Components (with Rob Pooley, Addison-Wesley, 1999; 2nd ed., 2006)
- How to Write Good Programs: A Guide for Students (Cambridge University Press, 2020)
