= Fellow of the Royal Society of Chemistry =

Fellowship awarded by the Royal Society of Chemistry

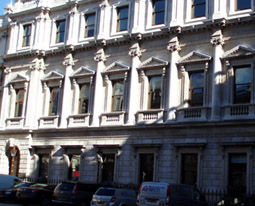
- The London Chemistry Centre
- Location: London, UK
- Website: rsc.org/membership-and-community/join/membership-regulations/

Fellowship of the Royal Society of Chemistry (FRSC) is one of the most prestigious awards conferred by the Royal Society of Chemistry (RSC) in the United Kingdom.

== FRSC award ==
Achieving Fellow status in the chemical profession signals to the broader community a high level of accomplishment as a professional chemist. Eligibility for Fellow status is open to Members of the Royal Society of Chemistry (MRSC) who have excelled in their fields through patents, scientific publications, discoveries, and other notable achievements. To be elected, the fellows must have made an outstanding contribution to the advancement of the chemical sciences; or to the advancement of the chemical sciences as a profession; or have been distinguished in the management of a chemical sciences organization.

In all cases, sponsor references from other RSC Fellows are required. The award of designatory letters FRSC is subject to the final approval of the RSC Applications Committee. In addition to the above, all RSC membership requires acceptance and adherence to a specific code of conduct and an established set of high standards of ethical and professional behavior. The RSC continuously establishes, and evaluates professional qualifications and the awarding of its designatory letters and awards. See Category:Fellows of the Royal Society of Chemistry for examples of fellows.

Honorary Fellowship of the Society ("HonFRSC") is awarded for distinguished service in the field of chemistry.
