= List of University of Manchester people =

This is a list of University of Manchester people. Many famous or notable people have worked or studied at the Victoria University of Manchester and the University of Manchester Institute of Science and Technology institutions, which combined in 2004 to form the University of Manchester.

The following list includes the names of all 25 Nobel Prize laureates among them (in bold print).

== Fine and applied arts ==
=== Architecture ===
- Stephen Hodder, English architect, winner of the RIBA Stirling Prize in 1996
- Dalibor Vesely, Honorary Professorial Fellow at the Manchester School of Architecture, architect (RIBA Annie Spink Award for Excellence in Architectural Education 2006)
- Paul Waterhouse, son of Alfred Waterhouse. He designed Girton College at Cambridge University as well as the Manchester Museum, Refuge Assurance Building, the Christie Library and the Whitworth Hall in Manchester.

=== Literature ===
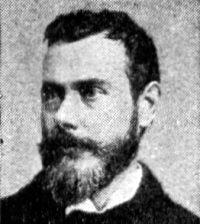
Francis Thompson, poet

- Martin Amis, professor of creative writing, British novelist and author
- W. B. Anderson, Scottish classicist
- Sir Malcolm Bradbury, English author
- Brian Cox (C. B. Cox) (1928–2008), professor of English literature, founder of the Poetry Centre
- Patricia Duncker, British novelist and Professor of Contemporary Literature
- Terry Eagleton, literary theorist, academic teacher
- M. J. Hyland, novelist and lecturer in creative writing
- Grevel Lindop, poet, academic and literary critic
- W. G. Sebald, German author
- Alison Sharrock, Professor of Classics
- Colm Tóibín, Irish novelist and Professor of Creative Writing
- Eugène Vinaver, French literary scholar specialising in the Arthurian cycle
- Jeanette Winterson, Professor of Creative Writing

=== Others ===
- John Casken, composer and professor of composition
- Anna Ford, broadcaster, former university chancellor
- G. Howell-Baker (1871–1919), artist and illustrator (at Owen's College)

== Natural and applied sciences ==
- William Boyd Dawkins, geologist
- James Lovelock, independent scientist and prominent environmentalist. Proposed the Gaia hypothesis. Graduated with a degree in chemistry in 1941.
- Sir John Maddox, Editor of Nature for 22 years
- Gordon Manley, climatologist

=== Psychology ===
- C. E. M. Hansel
- Adrian Wells

=== Biology and chemistry ===
- Sir James Baddiley, biochemist
- Eve Billing, plant pathologist, specialist in fire blight
- **Melvin Calvin**, awarded Nobel Prize in 1961 for his research on the carbon dioxide assimilation in plants
- Katherine Coward, pharmacologist and researcher into vitamin A

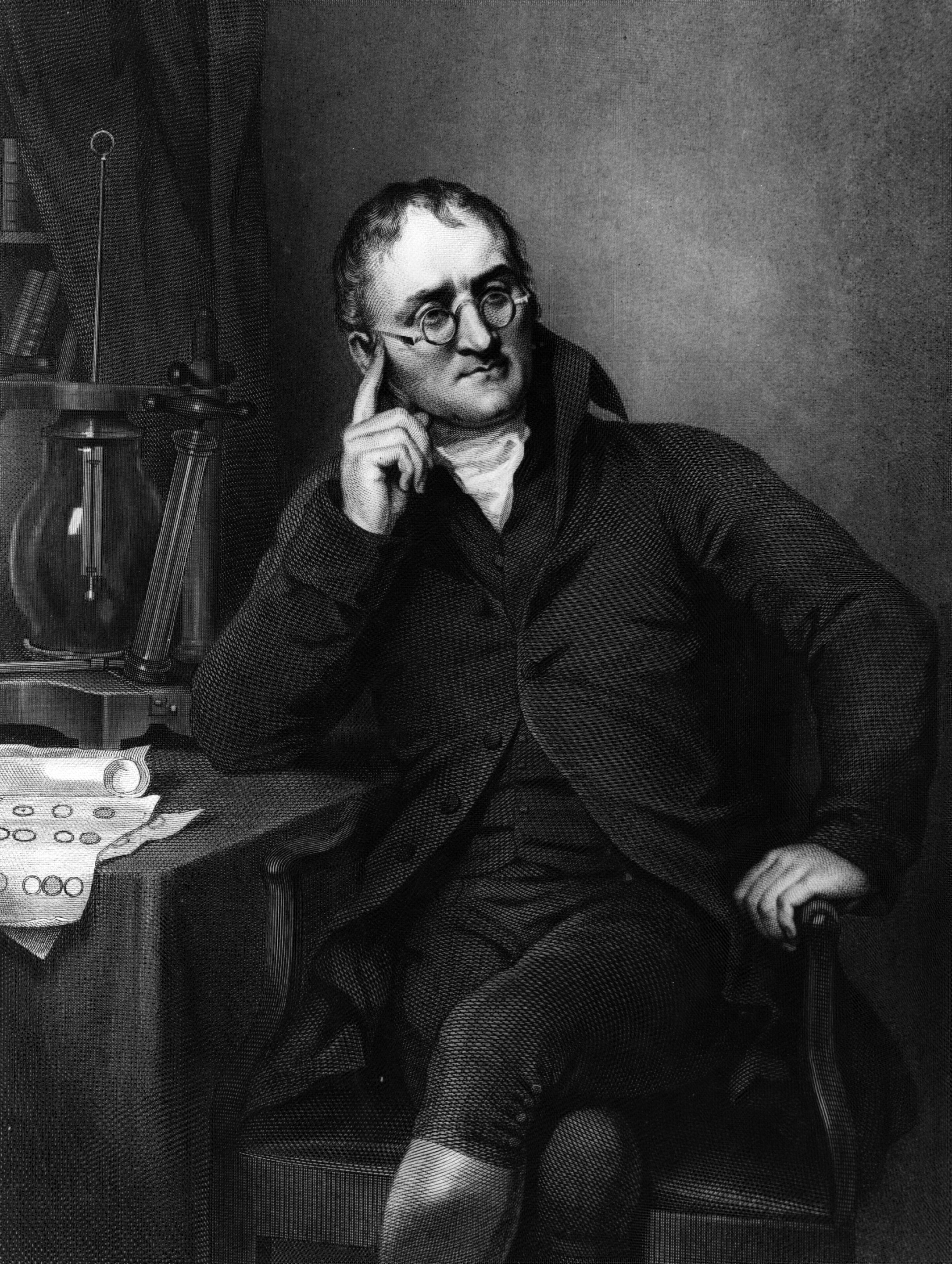
John Dalton, founder of modern chemistry and atomic theory

- John Dalton, the founder of modern chemistry and atomic theory; one of the founders of UMIST
- Kathleen Mary Drew-Baker (Lecturer, 1922–1957), phycologist
- Raymond Dwek, biochemist
- Sir Edward Frankland, analytical chemist; pioneer in organometallic chemistry
- **Arthur Harden** (awarded Nobel Prize in 1929), for investigations on the fermentation of sugar and fermentative enzymes
- **Walter Haworth** (awarded Nobel Prize in 1937), for his investigations on carbohydrates and vitamin C
- John Joule, chemist
- Charles Gordon Hewitt, pioneering ecologist and conservationist
- Russell P. Hughes, professor of chemistry at Dartmouth College
- Frederic Jevons, Professor of Liberal Studies in Science, awarded inaugural UNESCO Prize for Science and Technology Policy, 1992
- Douglas Kell, biochemist; former Chief Executive of the Biotechnology and Biological Sciences Research Council (BBSRC)
- David Leigh, Sir Samuel Hall Chair of Chemistry, pioneer of synthetic molecular machines and molecular knots
- Brian John Marples (1907–1997), Professor of Zoology at the University of Otago 1937–1967
- Sir Kenneth Mather, botanist and geneticist, Vice Chancellor of the University of Southampton 1965–1971
- Barbara Mawer, biochemist and medical researcher
- Gareth A. Morris, Professor of Physical Chemistry
- Paul O'Brien, Professor of Inorganic Materials
- Stephen Oliver, Professor in the Department of Biochemistry at the University of Cambridge
- William Henry Perkin, Jr., planned the new chemical laboratory building at Owens College in 1895
- Michael Polanyi, chemist, philosopher and noted polymath
- **John Charles Polanyi** (awarded Nobel Prize in 1986), for his contributions concerning the dynamics of chemical elementary processes
- G. S. R. Subba Rao, natural product chemist, Shanti Swarup Bhatnagar laureate
- **Robert Robinson** (awarded Nobel Prize in 1947), for his investigations on plant products of biological importance, especially the alkaloids
- Sir Henry Roscoe, chemist who considered the foundations of comparative photochemistry
- Tony Ryan, polymer chemist at the University of Sheffield
- Merton Sandler (1926–2014), professor of chemical pathology and pioneer in biological psychiatry
- Carl Schorlemmer, organic chemist and Socialist
- **Michael Smith** (awarded Nobel Prize in 1993), for his fundamental contributions to the establishment of oligonucleotide-based, site-directed mutagenesis
- Edwin Southern inventor of the Southern blot used in molecular biology for detection of DNA sequences
- Marie Stopes, botanist and birth control campaigner
- Sir Thomas Thorpe, investigated the relationship between substances molecular weights and their specific gravities
- **Alexander Todd** (awarded Nobel Prize in 1957), for his work on nucleotides and nucleotide co-enzymes
- Chaim Weizmann, discovered how to use bacterial fermentation
- William Crawford Williamson, natural historian and palaeobotanist
- Derek Yalden, zoologist, president of The Mammal Society

=== Computer science ===
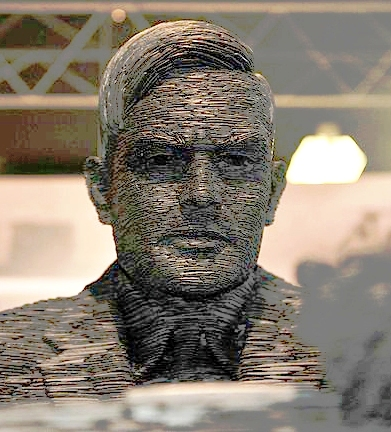
Statue of Turing by Stephen Kettle at Bletchley Park, commissioned by the American philanthropist Sidney E. Frank

- Sir John Fairclough, computer designer and Chief Scientific Adviser to the UK Government (1986–1990).
- John Fitzgerald, former Chair of Formal Methods Europe, professor at Newcastle University.
- Steve Furber, a designers of the BBC Micro and the ARM 32-bit RISC microprocessor.
- Carole Goble, computer scientist and a leading authority on the Semantic Web.
- Richard Grimsdale, electrical engineer and computer pioneer.
- Cliff Jones, co-developer of the Vienna Development Method.
- Tom Kilburn and Freddie Williams invented the Williams–Kilburn tube
- Paul Layzell, Professor of Computer Science and Pro-Vice-Chancellor at UMIST.
- Phil Moorby developer of Verilog and recipient of the Phil Kaufman Award (MSc Computer Science, 1974)
- Nandini Mukherjee, Indian computer scientist, researcher, politician and professor at the Jadavpur University.
- T. William Olle, work for Manchester Mark 1 and Ferranti Mercury computers.
- Chai Keong Toh, inventor of Wi-Fi Ad-Hoc Mode, Associativity-Based Routing.
- Alan Turing, one of the founders of Computer Science and AI.
- Freddie Williams, co-inventor the Williams–Kilburn tube, see above Tom Kilburn.

=== Engineering ===
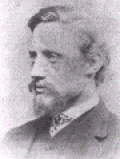
Osborne Reynolds

- Louis Casely-Hayford, Ghanaian former CEO of the Volta River Authority.
- Roy Chadwick, designer of the Lancaster bomber
- George E. Davis, founded the discipline of Chemical Engineering.
- William Fairbairn, Scottish engineer associated with water wheels and the Britannia tubular bridge
- Willis Jackson, Baron Jackson of Burnley, technologist and electrical engineer
- Eric Laithwaite, principally known for his development of the linear induction motor and Maglev rail system.
- Sheila McGuffie aeronautical engineer.
- Sheila Mwarangu, civil and structural engineer
- Osborne Reynolds, who worked in fluid mechanics.
- Beatrice Shilling, aeronautical engineer.
- Matilda Simon, 3rd Baroness Simon of Wythenshawe, mechanical engineer
- Belkis Valdman, chemical engineer

=== Mathematics ===
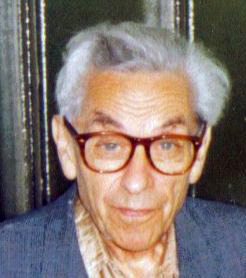
Paul Erdős

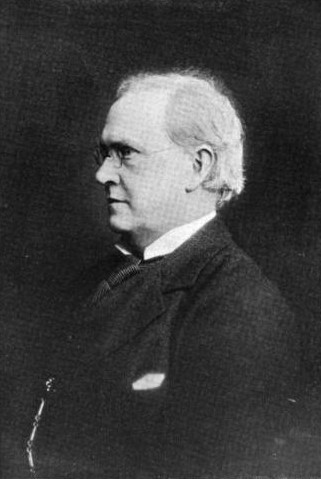
Sir Horace Lamb

- Frank Adams, leading figure in algebraic topology and homotopy theory.
- M. S. Bartlett, professor of mathematical statistics from 1947 to 1960, contributing to the analysis of data with spatial and temporal patterns.
- Robin Bullough, professor of Mathematical Physics famous for his work on optical solitons.
- Sydney Chapman developed theory on thermal diffusion
- John Crank, mathematical physicist, known for his work on the heat equation, which resulted in the Crank–Nicolson method.
- Harold Davenport, number theorist.
- Paul Erdős, work in number theory.
- Sydney Goldstein, fluid mechanics.
- Stefan Güttel, numerical analyst.
- Brian Hartley, mathematician working in group theory.
- Douglas Hartree, Beyer professor, constructed a differential analyser at Manchester in 1933.
- Ke Zhao, Chinese mathematician.
- Radha Kessar, researcher of finite groups.
- Helena Chmura Kraemer, American biostatistician
- Sir Horace Lamb, holder of the Beyer Chair of Applied Mathematics.
- James Lighthill, contributed to theoretical aerodynamics and aeroacoustics
- John Littlewood, mathematician: the Riemann zeta function, inequalities and the theory of functions.
- Kurt Mahler, mathematician.
- John McKay, known for his discovery of monstrous moonshine
- James Mercer, proved Mercer's theorem.
- Edward Milne, the study of radiative equilibrium, the structure of stellar atmospheres, theory of relativity and the interior structure of stars.
- Louis Mordell, contributions in number theory.
- Saralees Nadarajah, statistician and researcher of distribution theory.
- Bernhard Neumann, contributions to group theory.
- Hanna Neumann, group theorist, later first female Professor of Mathematics in Australia.
- Max Newman, directed the Colossus cryptanalysis program in WWII.
- Dame Kathleen Ollerenshaw, mathematician and politician
- Narahari Umanath Prabhu, Indian-American mathematician, known for his contributions to operations research.
- Lewis Fry Richardson, developer of numerical weather forecasting
- Korbinian Strimmer; biostatistician and Chair in Statistics.
- Alan Turing, WWII decoding work at Bletchley Park; development of Computer science.
- Peter Whittle, statistician.
- Ludwig Wittgenstein, philosopher and work in aeronautical research

=== Physics ===
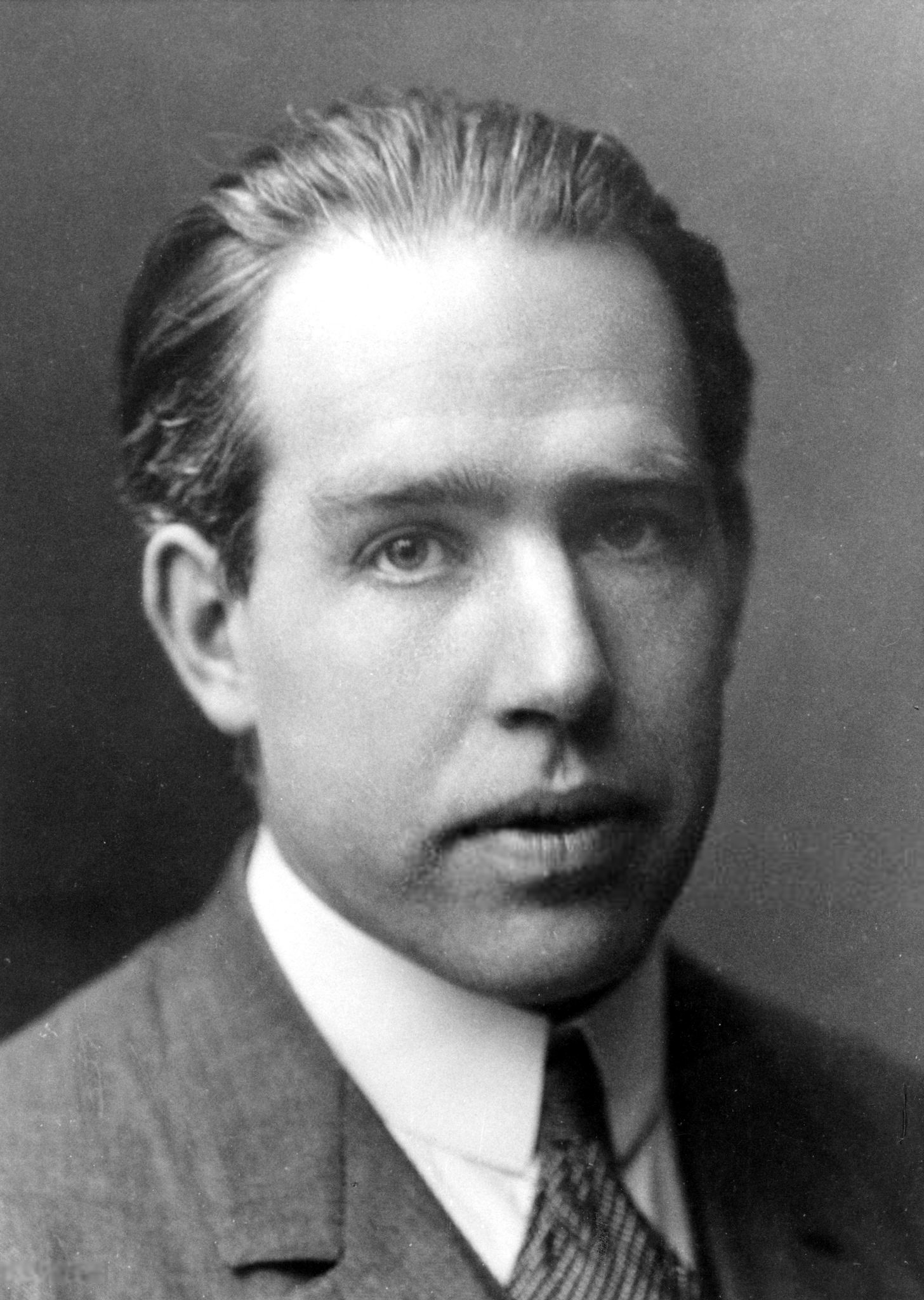
Niels Bohr

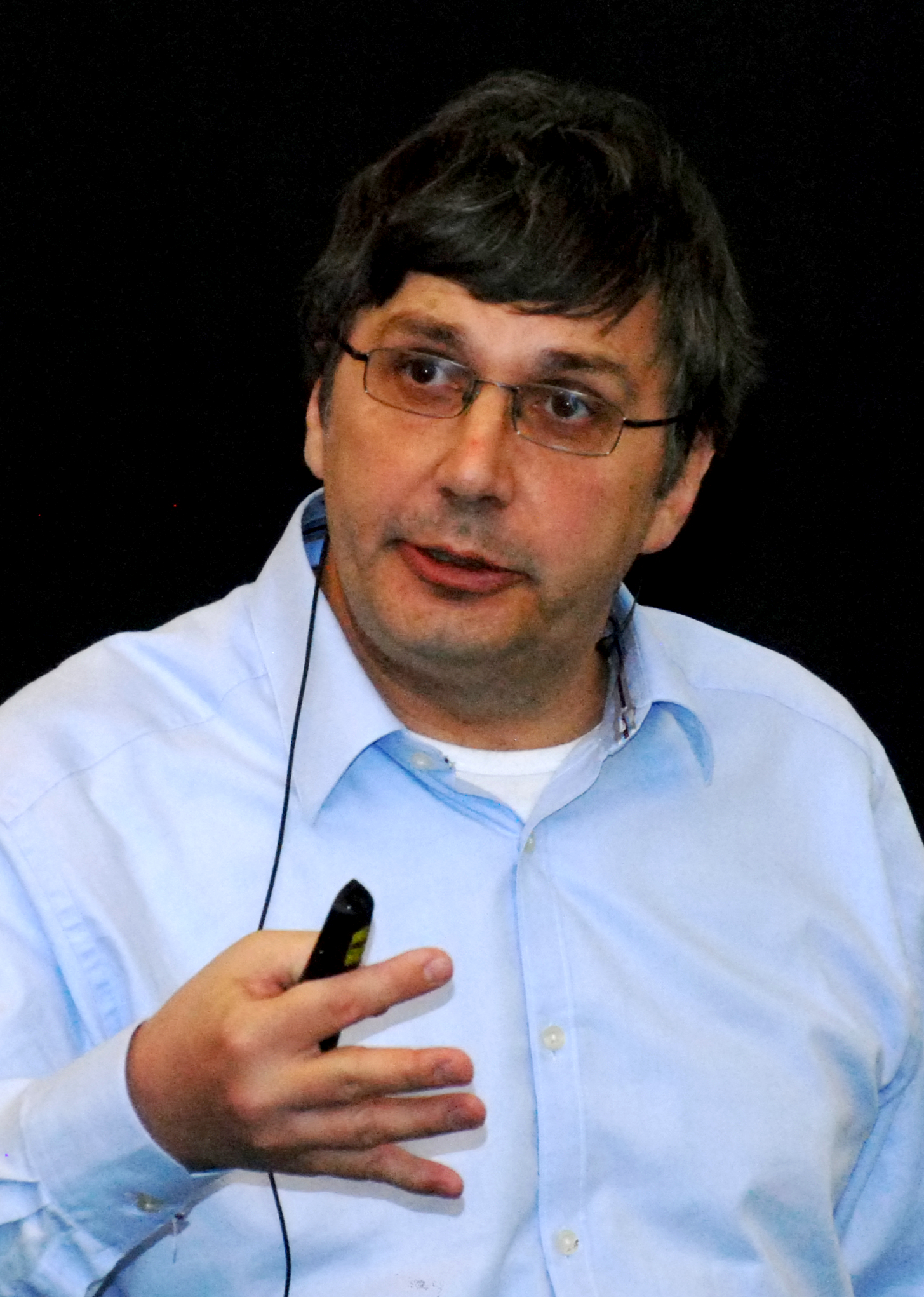
Andre Geim, awarded 2010 Nobel Prize in physics for pioneering work on graphene

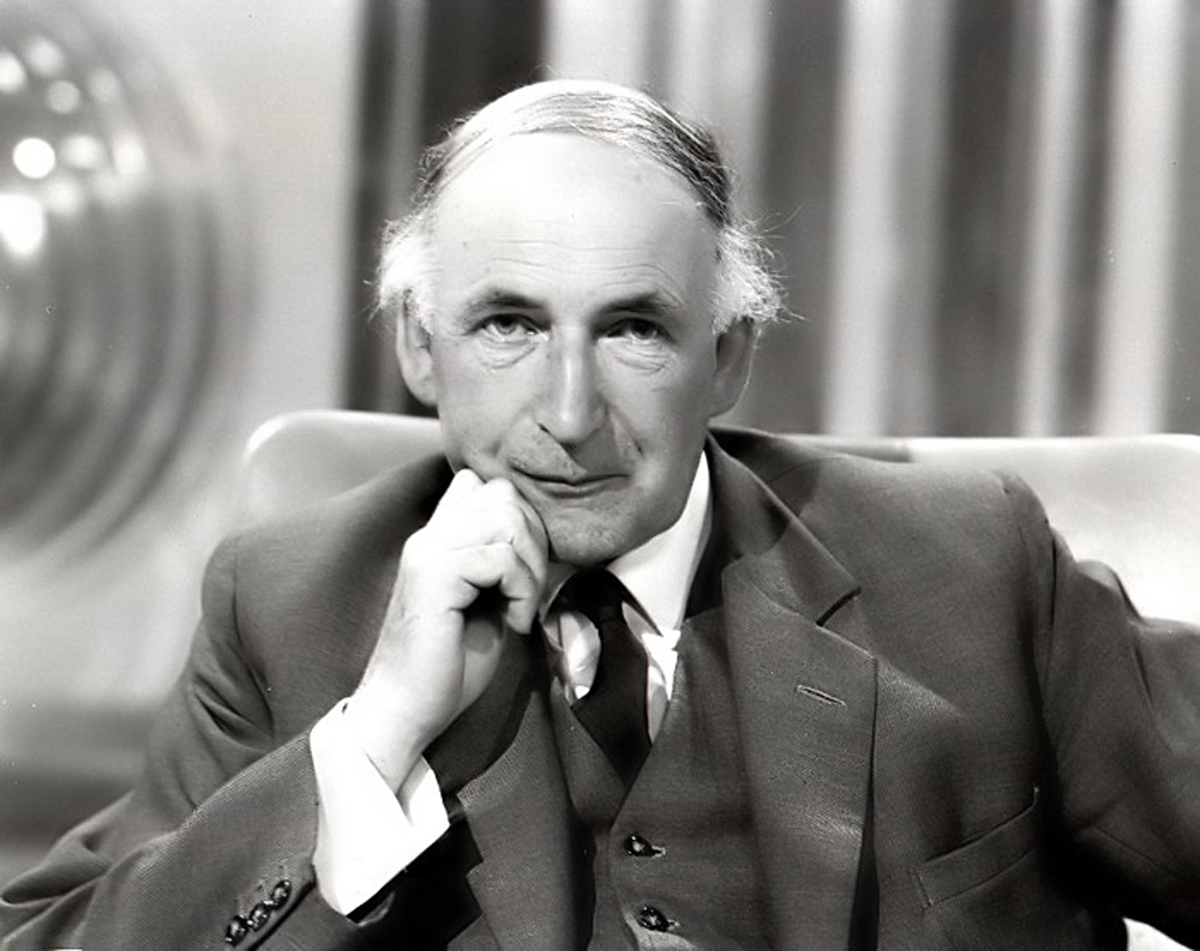
Sir Bernard Lovell, radio-astronomer

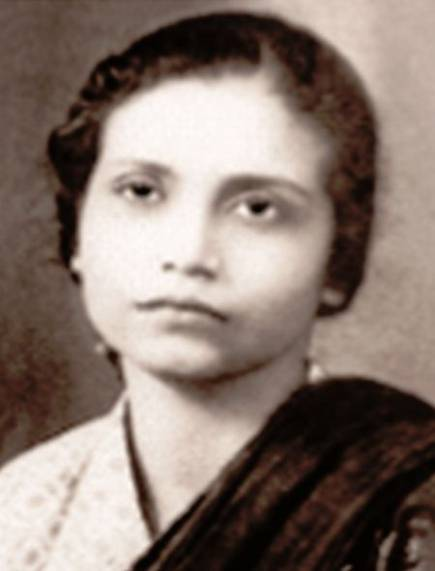
Bibha Chowdhuri Ph.D. cosmic rays 1949

- Mary Almond Physicist, radio astronomer, palaeomagnetist, mathematician and computer scientist. Undergraduate 1946-49 and PhD in radio astronomy 1952.
- **Hans Bethe** (awarded Nobel Prize in 1967), for his contributions to the theory of nuclear reactions, especially his discoveries concerning the energy production in stars. Research staff and Temporary Lecturer 1932.
- **Patrick M. Blackett** (awarded Nobel Prize in 1948), for developing cloud chamber and confirming/discovering positron. Director and Langworthy Professor of Physics (1937–1953).
- **Niels Bohr** (awarded Nobel Prize in 1922). Research Staff and Schuster Reader 1911–1916. Worked on structure of atom and first theory of quantum mechanics.
- **William Lawrence Bragg** (awarded Nobel Prize in 1915, along with his father, William Henry Bragg), for X-ray crystallography (their work led to the first discoveries of DNA and protein structures). Director and Langworthy Professor of Physics (1919–1937).
- Clifford Charles Butler. Co-discovered strange particles in 1947 with George Rochester. Went on to be head of physics department at Imperial College and then vice-chancellor at Loughborough University.
- **James Chadwick** (awarded Nobel Prize in 1935). Student (BSc & MSc) and Researcher 1908–1913 (under Rutherford). Discovered the neutron.
- Bibha Chowdhuri, First to discover mesons using nuclear emulsions. PhD in cosmic rays 1949.
- **Sir John Douglas Cockcroft** (awarded Nobel Prize in 1951), for his pioneering work with Rutherford and Walton, on the transmutation of atomic nuclei by artificially accelerated atomic particles. Born in Todmorden, he studied mathematics under Horace Lamb in 1914–1915 and received BSc and MSc in Electrical Engineering. Later he became Chancellor of UMIST and Director of BAERE (Manhattan Project Hall of Fame).
- Brian Cox, physicist working at CERN and popularizer of science. Most notable for his physics documentaries on the BBC and as a member of a few popular rock bands.
- Sir Charles Galton Darwin, (grandson of Charles Darwin) Schuster Reader in Mathematical Physics (1910–1914) working under Ernest Rutherford and Niels Bohr. He later became Director of the National Physical Laboratory.
- Mrinal Kumar Das Gupta Co-discoverer of the double radio source, Cygnus A, and Head of the Institute if Radio Physics and Electronics and the Centre for Advanced Studies at the University of Calcutta. PhD in radio astronomy 1952.
- **George de Hevesy** (awarded Nobel Prize in 1943), for his work on the use of isotopes as tracers in the study of chemical processes. Research Staff 1910–1913.
- Sir Arthur Eddington. Graduated in 1902 and became a lecturer in 1905. Founder of modern Astronomy. He made important contributions to the general theory of relativity and led an expedition team to validate it.
- Tamsin Edwards Climate scientist and science communicator. Undergraduate 1997-2001 and PhD in particle physics 2004.
- Victor Emery, British specialist on superconductors and superfluidity. His model for the electronic structure of the copper-oxide planes is the starting point for many analyses of high-temperature superconductors and is commonly known as the Emery model.
- Yvonne Elsworth, BSc (1970) and Phd (1976) now Professor of Helioseismology and Poynting Professor of Physics at the University of Birmingham.
- Wendy Flavell, Professor of Surface Physics at Manchester and Vice-Dean for Research in the Faculty of Science and Engineering.
- Jeff Forshaw, particle physicist and winner of the Maxwell Medal and Prize and the Kelvin Prize, gained his PhD at University of Manchester and is now professor of particle physics there.
- Gillian Gehring, undergraduate in physics 1959-1962 and emeritus Professor of Physics in the Department of Physics and Astronomy in the University of Sheffield. She was the second woman in the UK to become a Professor of Physics.
- Hans Geiger, Researcher 1906–1914, invented the Geiger counter and did the original "Rutherford scattering" experiment with Marsden (also the Geiger-Marsden experiment). Devised the famous Geiger ionization counter.
- **Andre Geim** (awarded Nobel Prize in 2010), for the discovery of graphene
- Danielle George, Master's degree in Physics at Manchester, now a Professor in Electrical and Electronic Engineering, and presenter of the 2014 Royal Institution Christmas Lectures
- Helen Gleeson, BSc in physics 1983, PhD in 1986 and the first woman to hold a chair in the Physics Department at the Victoria University of Manchester, before becoming Head of School in 2008. She specialises in soft matter and liquid crystals and is now Cavendish Professor and Head of the School of Physics at the University of Leeds.
- James Hamilton, Irish mathematician and theoretical physicist, helped to develop the theory of cosmic-ray mesons
- Edward Lee, built Britain's first infrared spectrometer and later served as Director of the Admiralty Research Laboratory.
- Sir John Lennard-Jones, entered Manchester University where he changed his subject to mathematics in 1912. After First World War service in the Royal Flying Corps, he returned to Manchester as lecturer in Mathematics, 1919–1922. Founder of modern theoretical chemistry. Lennard-Jones potential and LJ fluid are named after him.
- Patricia Lewis, nuclear physicist and arms control expert, who is currently Director of the United Nations Institute for Disarmament Research (UNIDIR).
- Henry Lipson, known for x-ray diffraction and its application to crystallography, professor at UMIST 1954–1977.
- Sir Bernard Lovell, Professor (1951–1990) and creator of the giant radio-telescope (the first large radio-telescope in the world with a diameter of 218 feet) at Jodrell Bank: pioneered the field of radio astronomy.
- Sir Ernest Marsden was born in Lancashire in 1888. He won scholarships to attend grammar school and gain entry to Manchester University. It was here he met Rutherford in his honours year. Rutherford suggested a project to investigate the backwards scattering of alpha particles from a metal foil. He did this in conjunction with Hans Geiger (of Geiger counter fame), and it proved to be the key experiment in the demise of the Plum pudding model of the atom leading directly to Rutherford's nuclear atom. Rutherford also recommended Marsden for the position of physics professor at what is now Victoria University of Wellington.
- Henry Moseley, who identified atomic number as the nuclear charges. He studied under Rutherford and brilliantly developed the application of X-ray spectra to study atomic structure; his discoveries resulted in a more accurate positioning of elements in the Periodic Table by closer determination of atomic numbers. Moseley was nominated for the 1915 Nobel Prize but was killed in action in August 1915 and could not receive the prize.
- **Nevill Francis Mott** (awarded Nobel Prize in 1977), for his fundamental theoretical investigations of the electronic structure of magnetic and disordered systems.
- **Konstantin Novoselov** (awarded Nobel Prize 2010), for his work on Graphene
- Tim O'Brien, professor of astronomy and science communicator. PhD in astronomy 1988.
- Herbert Parker, medical physicist. He was a pioneer of medical radiation therapy and radiation safety, known for introducing the roentgen equivalent physical (rep)
- Henry Plummer, astronomer who developed a gravitational potential function that can be used to model globular clusters and spherically-symmetric galaxies, known as the Plummer potential; Fellow of the Royal Society.
- John Henry Poynting. Student 1867–1872; Lecturer 1876–1879. Left to become Professor at Mason College (which became Birmingham University). He wrote on electrical phenomena and radiation and is best known for Poynting's vector. In 1891 he determined the mean density of the Earth and made a determination of the gravitational constant in 1893. The Poynting-Robertson effect was related to the theory of relativity.
- George Rochester discovered strange particles in 1947 with Clifford C Butler. Went on to become Chair of the Department at Durham University.

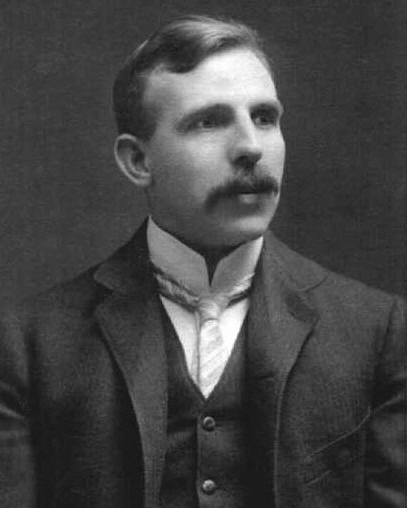
Ernest Rutherford, "the Father of Nuclear Physics" discovered the structure of the atom at the University of Manchester

- Keith Runcorn, PhD 1949, pioneer in the field of paleomagnetism.
- **Ernest Rutherford** (awarded Nobel Prize in 1908), for his investigations into the disintegration of the elements and the chemistry of radioactive substances (he was the first to probe the atom). Langworthy Professor of Physics (1907–1919).
- Mary Ryan is a Professor of Materials Science at Imperial College London and a Fellow of the Royal Academy of Engineering. Undergraduate 1988–91.
- Sir Arthur Schuster, Langworthy Professor of Physics (1888–1907), who made many contributions to optics and astronomy. Schuster's interests were wide-ranging: terrestrial magnetism, optics, solar physics, and the mathematical theory of periodicities. He introduced meteorology as a subject studied in British universities.
- Balfour Stewart, Scottish physicist, who devoted himself to meteorology and terrestrial magnetism.
- **J. J. Thomson** (awarded Nobel Prize in 1906). Studied and researched 1871–1876 (entered at age 14). Discovered the electron.
- **Charles Thomson Rees (C. T. R.) Wilson** (awarded Nobel Prize in 1927). Student 1884–1887. Invented the expansion cloud chamber.
- Evan James Williams worked with Bragg and Blackett in the Physical Laboratories in the 1920s.
- Sir Arnold Wolfendale, BSc 1948 and PhD 1954 in cosmic rays. Lecturer 1953–1956. 14th Astronomer Royal.
- Terry Wyatt particle physicist, Fellow of the Royal Society.

=== Physiology and medicine ===
The University of Manchester currently has 28 Fellows of the Academy of Medical Sciences. Present and historical University of Manchester people notable for their contributions to medicine and physiology include:

- John Webster Bride, surgeon who served in the Gallipolii campaign, and foundation fellow of the Royal College of Obstetricians and Gynaecologists
- John Charnley, orthopaedic surgeon, pioneer in hip replacement
- Hilary Critchley, Professor of Reproductive Medicine/Honorary Consultant in Obstetrics and Gynaecology at The University of Edinburgh
- Sally Davies, Chief Medical Officer for England
- Shepherd Dawson, psychologist
- Julius Dreschfeld, leading British physician and pathologist at the end of the 19th century
- Arthur Giles, noted gynaecologist and Foundation Fellow of the Royal College of Obstetricians and Gynecologists
- Isaac Walker Hall, pathologist and medical researcher
- **Archibald Vivian Hill** (awarded Nobel Prize in 1922), for his discovery relating to the production of heat in the muscle. One of the founders of the diverse disciplines of biophysics and operations research
- Ian Jacobs, gynaecologist and former vice-president of the University of Manchester
- Ralph Kohn, British medical scientist and founder of the Kohn foundation. He was knighted in the 2010 New Year Honours for services to science, music and charity.
- Frank Hamilton Lacey, surgeon and foundation fellow of the Royal College of Obstetricians and Gynaecologists
- Ethel Margaret Phillips, British medical missionary
- Sir Harry Platt, 1st Baronet, orthopaedic surgeon
- Sir John Randall, developer of the cavity magnetron
- Horace Smirk, doctor and researcher in hypertension
- Herchel Smith, a researcher at the University of Manchester, developed an inexpensive way of producing chemicals that stop women ovulating during their monthly menstrual cycle in 1961
- John Stopford, Baron Stopford of Fallowfield, anatomist; vice-chancellor
- **Sir John Sulston** (awarded Nobel Prize in 2002), for his discoveries concerning 'genetic regulation of organ development and programmed cell death'. In 2007, Sulston was announced as Chair of the newly founded Institute for Science, Ethics and Innovation at the University of Manchester.
- Raymond Tallis, gerontologist
- James Edwin Thompson (1863-1927), surgeon
- David H.H. Metcalfe Academic General Practitioner, Professor Of General Practice University of Manchester, President Royal College of General Practitioners
- Nesta Wells was the UKs first female police surgeon
- Charles Powell White, pathologist and cancer researcher

== Social sciences and education ==
=== Economics ===
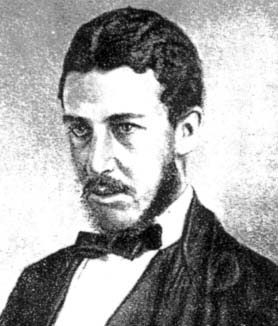
William Stanley Jevons, father of neoclassical economics

- Stafford Beer, British theorist
- Richard Blundell, British economist, lecturer in Econometrics from 1975–1984, the recipient of the Yrjö Jahnsson Award in 1995
- David Forrest, applied economist and econometrician, Professor of Economics at the Salford Business School
- **John Hicks** (awarded Nobel Prize in 1972), for his pioneering contributions to general economic equilibrium theory and welfare theory
- William Stanley Jevons, father of neoclassical economics, he was elected professor of logic in 1866
- **W. Arthur Lewis** (awarded Nobel Prize in 1979), for his pioneering research into economic development research with particular consideration of the problems of developing countries.
- **Joseph Stiglitz** (awarded Nobel Prize in 2001), for laying the foundations for the theory of markets with asymmetric information. An economist, public policy analyst, political activist, and professor at Columbia University and heads the Brooks World Poverty Institute (BWPI) at the University of Manchester.

=== Education ===
- Catherine Isabella Dodd, educational theorist, first woman on the academic staff of the Victoria University of Manchester
- Kathleen Tattersall, first chief regulator at Ofqual

=== Law, public administration and social welfare ===
- Daniel Brennan, Baron Brennan, barrister, Deputy High Court Judge and a Recorder in the Crown Court
- Karina Constantino David, chairperson of the Civil Service Commission of the Philippines, sociologist
- Hugh Emlyn-Jones, judge and politician
- Samuel Finer, political scientist
- Brenda Hale, Baroness Hale of Richmond, first woman to become a judge in the House of Lords, President of the Supreme Court of the United Kingdom
- Raymond Ho, member of the Legislative Council of Hong Kong
- Admiral Sir John Kerr, admiral and Commander-in-Chief Naval Home Command in the Royal Navy
- Irene Khan, former Secretary General of Amnesty International
- Sir Maurice Oldfield, Director-General of MI6
- Esther Roper, suffragette and social justice campaigner
- Rona Robinson, suffragette and first woman to gain a first-class chemistry degree in the UK.
- Peter Smith, Judge of the High Court of Justice.
- Ben Stephens, Lord Stephens of Creevyloughgare, Justice of the Supreme Court of the United Kingdom
- Tommy Thomas, barrister, Attorney General of Malaysia (2018–present)

=== Politics ===
- Haider Al-Abadi, Iraqi politician and former Prime Minister of Iraq
- Ariff Sabri Abdul Aziz, Malaysian Member of Parliament
- David Alliance, Baron Alliance (1932-2025), businessman and politician, Member of the House of Lords
- Akenten Appiah-Menka, Ghanaian politician
- Robert Noton Barclay, former MP for Manchester Exchange and Lord Mayor of Manchester

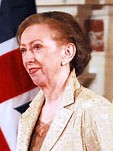
Margaret Beckett, former Secretary of State for Foreign and Commonwealth Affairs

- Margaret Beckett, Member of Parliament and former Secretary of State for Foreign and Commonwealth Affairs
- Joe Borg, Maltese politician and current European Commissioner for Fisheries and Maritime Affairs
- Nick Brown, Labour Member of Parliament
- Gaston Browne, Prime Minister of Antigua and Barbuda
- Fiona Bruce, Conservative MP
- Harry Butcher, Canadian MP
- Liam Byrne, Member of Parliament and Minister of State, attended Harvard as a Fulbright Scholar
- John Cameron, Liberal Democrat Councillor
- Sir Sydney Chapman, architect and Conservative MP
- David Clark, Baron Clark of Windermere, Labour politician and author
- Ann Coffey, Member of Parliament
- David Currie, Baron Currie of Marylebone, economist and cross bench member of the House of Lords
- Alexander Apeatu Aboagye da Costa, Ghanaian politician
- Ede Dafinone, Nigerian accountant, Senator of the Federal Republic of Nigeria
- Seb Dance, Member of the European Parliament, Deputy Mayor of London
- Den Dover, Member of the European Parliament
- John Dulanty, British Civil Servant and Irish diplomat
- Norman Geras, Marxist philosopher
- Miranda Grell, Labour Councillor and first person found guilty of making false statements under the Representation of the People Act 1983
- Bruce Grocott, Baron Grocott, Labour Party politician
- Vilmundur Gylfason, Icelandic politician, historian and poet
- Douglas Hacking, 1st Baron Hacking, Conservative politician
- Monica Harding, Member of Parliament
- Teo Chee Hean, current Deputy Prime Minister of Singapore
- Mark Hendrick, Member of Parliament
- Michael D. Higgins, Ninth President of Ireland
- Dave Hill, Marxist political and educational activist, Research Professor in Education at Anglia Ruskin University
- Tom Hunt, serving Member of Parliament for Ipswich
- Beverley Hughes, Member of Parliament and Minister of State
- Sean Hughes, history teacher and Labour politician
- Jamaluddin Jarjis, current Minister of Science, Technology and Innovation of Malaysia
- Kurankyi-Taylor, Ghanaian politician
- Bheki W. J. Langa, South African former Ambassador to Russia and China, currently the domestic head of the State Security Agency
- Peter Levene, Baron Levene of Portsoken, chairman of Lloyd's of London and former Lord Mayor of London
- Harold Lever, Baron Lever of Manchester, barrister, Labour cabinet minister

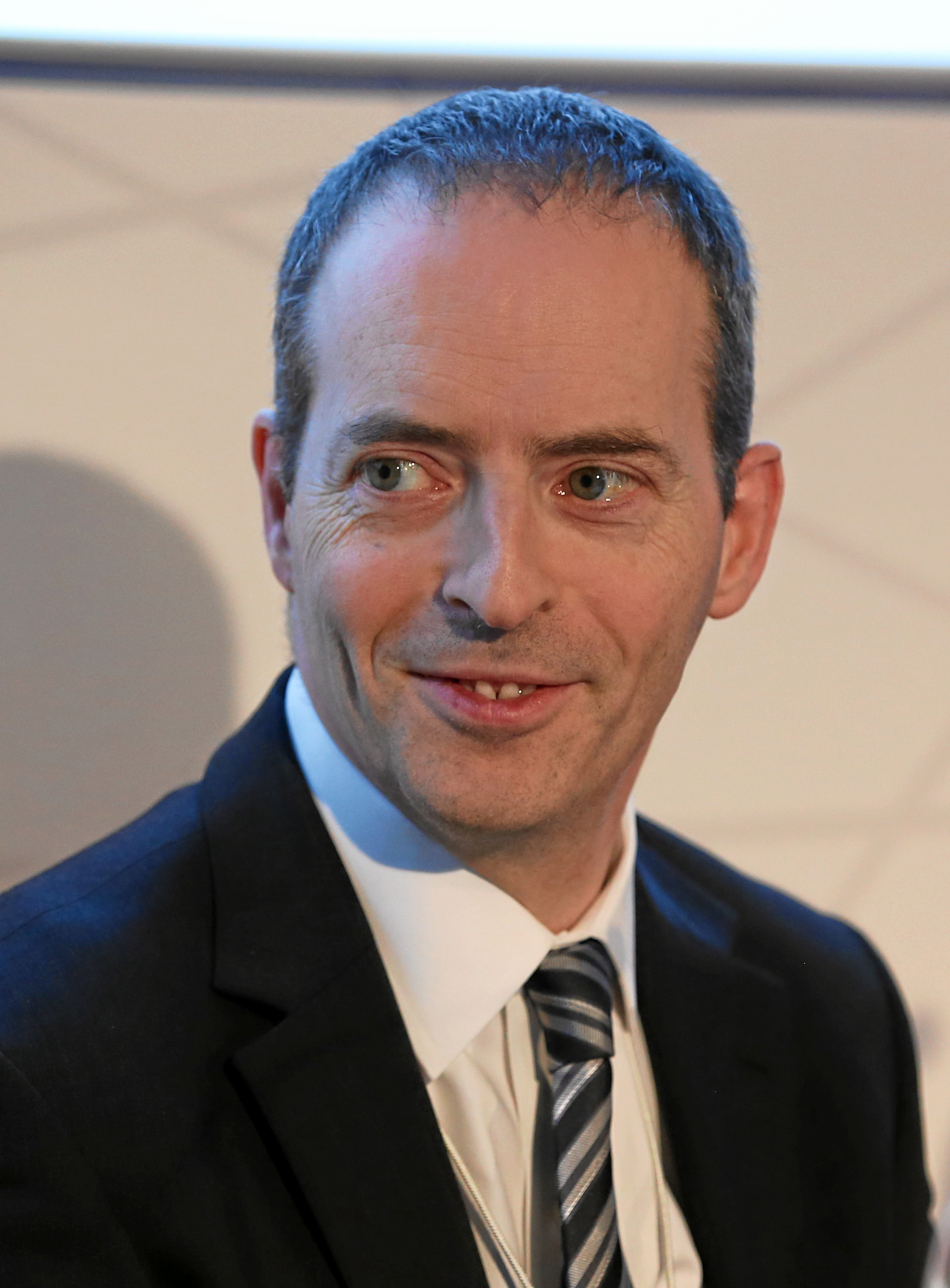
Ian Livingston, Baron Livingston of Parkhead, former Group CEO of BT

- Ian Livingston, Baron Livingston of Parkhead, BSc Economics, former Group CEO of BT Group and current Minister for Trade and Investment in the UK Government
- Tony Lloyd, Member of Parliament
- Kevin G. Lynch, Deputy Minister of Finance in Canada, Canada's most senior civil servant
- John Mann, Member of Parliament
- Arlene McCarthy, Member of the European Parliament
- Austin Mitchell, Member of Parliament
- Maxwell Mkwezalamba, Malawian politician and Commissioner for Economic Affairs for the African Union Commission
- Julie Morgan, Member of the National Assembly for Wales
- Alfred Morris, Labour Co-operative politician and disability campaigner
- Said Musa, former prime minister of Belize
- Ólafur Ragnar Grímsson, President of Iceland
- Adeniran Ogunsanya, Nigerian politician
- John Osborne, chief minister of Montserrat
- Christian Ouellet, Canadian Member of Parliament
- Christabel Pankhurst, suffragette
- Christopher Prout, Baron Kingsland, barrister and Conservative politician
- Mekapati Goutham Reddy, Indian politician
- Jonathan Reynolds, Business Secretary
- George Maxwell Richards, President of Trinidad and Tobago
- Paul Rose, former Labour Party politician
- Sir Lloyd Erskine Sandiford, former prime minister of Barbados
- Ahmed Mohamed Mohamoud, the current President of the Somaliland region of Somalia
- Ottón Solís, economics minister of Costa Rica
- Robert Spink, Member of Parliament
- Jo Stevens, Secretary of State for Wales
- Andrew Stunell, Member of Parliament
- Samia Suluhu, president of Tanzania
- Geoffrey Tordoff, Baron Tordoff, businessman and politician
- Chuka Umunna, Member of Parliament
- Georgina Waylen, Professor of Politics
- Chaim Weizmann, first President of Israel
- Dafydd Wigley, Former MP, AM and Leader of Plaid Cymru
- Ellen Wilkinson, Labour Cabinet Minister
- Kirsty Williams, Member of the National Assembly for Wales
- Phil Woolas, Member of Parliament
- William Wragg, Member of Parliament

=== Social anthropology ===
- Richard T. Antoun, professor emeritus of Anthropology at Binghamton University, stabbed to death by student in 2009
- Max Gluckman, Rhodes Scholar who became Manchester's first professor of social anthropology in 1949
- Norman Long, known for his work on the sociology of international development
- J. P. S. Uberoi, retired sociology professor at the Delhi School of Economics

=== Sociology ===
- James Nazroo, Professor of Sociology

== Others ==
- Daniel Everett, anthropologist and linguist best known for his study of the Amazon Basin's Pirahã people and their language
- Edward Harper Parker, barrister and sinologist, became first chair professor in the field of Chinese studies in 1901.

=== History ===
- Ella Armitage, taught history at Owens College, researcher in medieval history and archaeology
- T. S. Ashton, economic historian. Served as Lecturer from 1921–1944. He notably turned down a knighthood in 1957.
- Max Beloff, Baron Beloff, international historian and university administrator
- Stefan Berger, professor of Modern German and Comparative European History
- M. R. D. Foot, military historian, and former British Army intelligence officer with the Special Operations Executive
- Sir Ian Kershaw, historian of Nazi Germany and biographer of Hitler, taught in the History department from 1968 to 1987.
- Sir Colin Lucas, historian of the French Revolution and Vice-Chancellor of Oxford University.
- Lewis Namier, Professor of Modern History 1931–1952.
- J. E. Neale, historian of the Elizabethan period and of Parliament
- John Pickstone, historian of science and medicine
- Walter Eustace Rhodes, historian, killed during the First World War on 13 July 1918
- A. J. P. Taylor, lecturer 1931–1938, historian of the 20th century
- Thomas Frederick Tout, professor of Medieval History.
- Michael Wood, TV historian appointed as Professor of Public History in 2013.

=== Religion and philosophy ===
- Samuel Alexander, philosopher, the first Jewish fellow of an Oxbridge college
- Helen Beebee, philosopher, former Samuel Hall Professor of Philosophy
- F. F. Bruce, Biblical scholar, Rylands Professor of Biblical Criticism and Exegesis
- Donald Coggan, Archbishop of Canterbury (1974–1980)
- Hubert Cunliffe-Jones, Chairman of the Congregational Union of England and Wales and professor
- Marie Madeleine Davy (1903–1998), French historian, philosopher, war resister, recipient of the Croix de Guerre by Charles de Gaulle
- Alasdair MacIntyre, known for his contribution to moral and political philosophy
- Owen Prys, minister and academic
- Barry Smith, philosopher

== Chancellors ==
Victoria University
- 1880–1891: William Cavendish, 7th Duke of Devonshire
- 1892–1904: John Poyntz Spencer, 5th Earl Spencer

Victoria University of Manchester

- 1904–1907: John Poyntz Spencer, 5th Earl Spencer
- 1907–1908: Spencer Compton Cavendish, 8th Duke of Devonshire
- 1908–1923: John Morley, Viscount Morley of Blackburn
- 1923–1940: David Alexander Edward Lindsay, 27th Earl of Crawford and 10th Earl of Balcarres
- 1940–1944: vacant
- 1944–1964: Frederick James Marquis, 1st Baron Woolton
- 1965–1986: Andrew Cavendish, 11th Duke of Devonshire
- 1986–1993: J. A. G. Griffith
- 1994–2001: Brian Flowers, Baron Flowers, physicist and public servant, Professor of theoretical physics (1958–61), Langworthy Professor of physics (1961–72), Rector of Imperial College London (1973–85) and vice-chancellor (1985–90).
- 2001–2004: Anna Ford, television presenter and journalist.

UMIST

- 1994–1996: Sir John Mason
- 1996–2002: Sir Roland Smith
- 2002–2004: Sir Terry Leahy, former CEO of Tesco.

University of Manchester

- 2004–2008: Anna Ford and Sir Terry Leahy, Co-Chancellors
- 2008–2015: Tom Bloxham, British property developer.
- 2015–2022: Lemn Sissay, poet, writer and broadcaster.
- 2022–present: Nazir Afzal, lawyer.

== Vice-Chancellors ==
- Joseph Gouge Greenwood, English classical scholar, second Principal of Owens College, Manchester (1857–89), and first Vice-Chancellor of Victoria University (1880–86)
- Sir Adolphus William Ward, Principal of Owens College (1889–97), Vice-Chancellor (1887–91)
- Gerald Henry Rendall, University College, Liverpool, Vice-Chancellor (1891–1895)
- Adolphus William Ward (second term), Vice-Chancellor (1895–1897)
- Nathan Bodington, Yorkshire College, Leeds, Vice-Chancellor (1897–1901)
- Sir Alfred Hopkinson, lawyer, academic and politician, Principal of Owens College (1898–1904); afterwards Vice-Chancellor of the Victoria University of Manchester (1903–13)
- Frederick Ernest Weiss, (1913–15), botanist
- Sir Henry Alexander Miers, English geologist, Vice-Chancellor (1915–26)
- Sir Walter Hamilton Moberly, Vice-Chancellor (1926–34)
- John Stopford, Baron Stopford of Fallowfield, Vice-Chancellor (1934–56), anatomist
- Sir William Mansfield Cooper (1956–70); formerly Registrar; also professor of industrial and commercial law
- Sir Arthur Armitage, President of Queens' College, Cambridge (1958–70), Vice-Chancellor of Cambridge University (1965–67), Vice-Chancellor of Victoria University of Manchester (1970–80)
- Sir Mark Henry Richmond (1981–90)
- Sir Martin Harris, Vice-Chancellor of the Victoria University of Manchester (1992–2004)
- Alan Gilbert, historian, Vice-Chancellor (2004–10)
- Dame Nancy Rothwell, physiologist, Vice-Chancellor (2010–2024)
- Duncan Ivison, Vice-Chancellor (2024-present)

== See also ==
- Category:People associated with the University of Manchester
- Natives of Manchester
