= Leader of the Conservatives in the European Parliament =

The leader of the Conservatives in the European Parliament was the most senior Conservative member of the European Parliament. The post was last held by Geoffrey Van Orden, who succeeded Ashley Fox in 2019. His term ended after the United Kingdom's withdrawal from the European Union.

== Leaders of Conservative MEPs (1973 to 2020) ==
Leader	Portrait	Constituency	Took office	Left office	Term length
Sir Peter Kirk		Member of Parliament for Saffron Walden	1 January 1973	17 April 1977	4 years and 107 days
Geoffrey Rippon		Member of Parliament for Hexham	17 April 1977	7 July 1979	2 years and 82 days
James Scott-Hopkins		Hereford and Worcester	7 July 1979	9 February 1982	2 years and 218 days
Henry Plumb		Cotswold	9 February 1982	7 July 1987	5 years and 149 days
Christopher Prout		Shropshire and Stafford	7 July 1987	16 June 1994	6 years and 345 days
Tom Spencer		Surrey	16 June 1994	16 September 1997	3 years and 93 days
Edward McMillan-Scott		Yorkshire and the Humber	16 September 1997	14 December 2001	4 years and 90 days
Jonathan Evans		Wales	14 December 2001	14 December 2004	3 years and 1 day
Timothy Kirkhope		Yorkshire and the Humber	14 December 2004	28 November 2007	2 years and 350 days
Giles Chichester		South West England and Gibraltar	28 November 2007	5 June 2008	190 days
Philip Bushill-Matthews		West Midlands	5 June 2008	18 November 2008	167 days
Timothy Kirkhope		Yorkshire and the Humber	18 November 2008	23 November 2010	2 years and 5 days
Martin Callanan		North East England	23 November 2010	1 March 2012	1 year and 99 days
Richard Ashworth		South East England	14 March 2012	19 November 2013	1 year and 250 days
Syed Kamall		London	19 November 2013	25 November 2014	1 year and 6 days
Ashley Fox		South West England and Gibraltar	25 November 2014	11 June 2019	4 years and 198 days
Geoffrey Van Orden		East of England	11 June 2019	31 January 2020	234 days
