= Walter Rhodes =

Walter Rhodes may refer to:

- Walter Rhodes (musician), American blues musician
- Walter Eustace Rhodes (1872–1918), English librarian, author and translator
- Walter Rhodes (murderer)
- Walter Rhodes (Island in the Sky), character in the 1938 film Island in the Sky
