= Henry Plumb, Baron Plumb =

British politician and farmer (1925–2022)

The Right Honourable The Lord Plumb DL
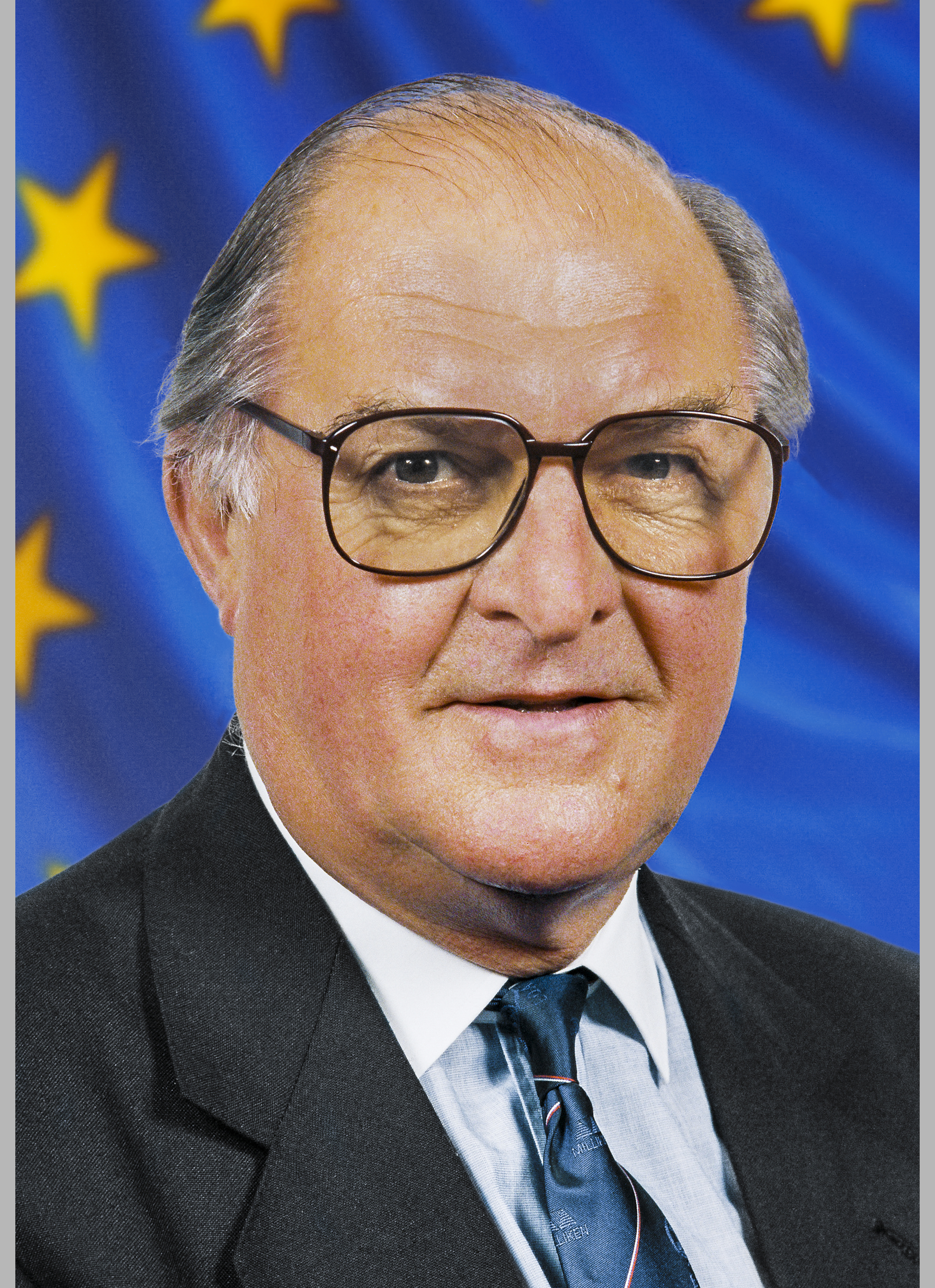
- Official portrait, 1987

Member of the House of Lords
- Lord Temporal
- Life peerage 6 April 1987 – 3 November 2017

16th President of the European Parliament
- In office 20 January 1987 – 25 July 1989
- Preceded by: Pierre Pflimlin
- Succeeded by: Enrique Barón

Leader of the Conservatives in the European Parliament
- In office 9 February 1982 – 7 July 1987
- Preceded by: James Scott-Hopkins
- Succeeded by: Christopher Prout

Member of the European Parliament for Cotswolds
- In office 7 June 1979 – 10 June 1999
- Preceded by: Constituency created
- Succeeded by: Constituency abolished

President of National Farmers' Union of England and Wales
- In office 4 February 1970 – 1 February 1979
- Deputy: Richard C. Butler
- Preceded by: Gwilym Williams
- Succeeded by: Richard C. Butler

Personal details
- Born: Charles Henry Plumb; 27 March 1925 Ansley, Warwickshire, England
- Died: 15 April 2022 (aged 97) Sutton Coldfield, Birmingham, England
- Party: Conservative
- Other political affiliations: European Democrats
- Spouse: Marjorie Dunn (m. 1947; died 2019)
- Children: 3
- Occupation: Farmer; politician

Charles Henry Plumb, Baron Plumb, DL (27 March 1925 – 15 April 2022) was a British politician and farmer who went into politics as a leader of the National Farmers' Union. He later became active in the Conservative Party and was elected as a Member of the European Parliament (MEP). He served as an MEP from 1979 to 1999, and was President of the European Parliament from 1987 to 1989, the only Briton to hold the post.

== Personal life ==
Plumb's family was from Cheshire and had been in farming for several generations. He was born in Ansley, Warwickshire, on 27 March 1925. His father farmed at Coleshill, Warwickshire, where his son joined him in 1940. He took over running the farm after his father died in 1952. The farm ran to 300 acres (1.2 km^{2}) and consisted primarily of a dairy herd (200 pedigree Ayrshire cattle) with 70 breeding sows and 100 acres (0.40 km^{2}) of grain.

Plumb was married to Marjorie (née Dunn) from 1947 until her death in 2019; they had three children. He died from a stroke at Good Hope Hospital in Sutton Coldfield on 15 April 2022, at the age of 97.

== National Farmers' Union ==
After rising through the county branch, in 1965, Plumb was elected vice-president of the National Farmers' Union. Although only 40 years old he was considered for the presidency, but had to settle for promotion to deputy president in 1966. In the late 1960s, Plumb was a member of the Northumberland Committee inquiring into the outbreak of foot-and-mouth disease, being the only working farmer on the committee. Towards the end of the committee's deliberations, a report from political correspondent J. W. Murray in Farmer and Stockbreeder said Plumb had single-handedly persuaded the committee to recommend prohibiting the import of carcass meat from countries where foot-and-mouth was endemic.

In January 1970, the incumbent president of the NFU Gwilym Williams failed to get the 80% support necessary to be re-elected, and Plumb was elected president of the NFU in his place. Plumb's term of office included British accession to the European Economic Community and its Common Agricultural Policy and Plumb negotiated for greater support for British agriculture; he stressed that Britain no longer had the economic power to bring cheap food prices. Plumb was, however, a strong supporter of British membership of the European Economic Community; he was considered as a possible director for the pro-market campaign in the 1975 referendum campaign and was described as one of its most indefatigable spokesmen. Plumb was awarded a knighthood in the 1973 Birthday Honours.

Throughout the 1970s, Plumb had Richard C. Butler as his deputy at the NFU, and Butler succeeded him as president when he retired in 1979.

== European Parliament ==
Having joined the Conservative Party, Plumb was elected Member of the European Parliament for the Cotswolds seat in 1979 and remained in the European Parliament until 1999, being President of the European Parliament from 1987 to 1989. He was the only British president of the European parliament. He was made a life peer as Baron Plumb, of Coleshill in the County of Warwickshire on 6 April 1987.

On 11 October 1988, Plumb received international attention. During the papal visit to the European Parliament in Strasbourg, Pope John Paul II was delivering a speech. Northern Ireland MEP Ian Paisley, a staunch Protestant and opponent of Catholicism, heckled throughout the delivery, brandishing posters accusing the Pope of being the Antichrist. Using his position as president, Plumb ordered Paisley to leave the chamber.

He retired from the House of Lords on 3 November 2017. He was also Chancellor of Coventry University between 1995 and 2007.

=== 2012 allegations of conflict of interest ===
In June 2012, the Bureau of Investigative Journalism and The Independent newspaper revealed how senior members of the House of Lords failed to disclose their business interests in a public inquiry. As of July 2012, Plumb's entry in the register of interests listed his only remunerated employment/profession as 'farming', despite his involvement with the Brussels-based lobbying firm Alber & Geiger since 2007. According to The Independent, Plumb insisted he did not need to register his involvement because he had “never been in employment, paid or unpaid” by the firm.

== Bibliography ==
- The Plumb Line: A Journey Through Agriculture and Politics. Greycoat Press. 2001. ISBN 978-1-899908-03-5. (Autobiography)

European Parliament
New constituency	Member of the European Parliament for Cotswolds; 1979–1999	Constituency abolished
Party political offices
Preceded by James Scott-Hopkins	Leader of the Conservatives in the European Parliament; 1982–1987	Succeeded by Christopher Prout
Political offices
Preceded by Pierre Pflimlin	President of the European Parliament; 1987–1989	Succeeded by Enrique Barón
