= Richard C. Butler =

Former NFU president

The Honourable Sir Richard Clive Butler DL

President of National Farmers' Union of England and Wales
- In office 1979–1986
- Preceded by: Henry Plumb
- Succeeded by: Simon Gourlay

Personal details
- Born: 12 January 1929
- Died: 28 January 2012 (aged 83)
- Education: Eton College; Pembroke College, Cambridge (MA)
- Occupation: Farmer; merchant banker
- Military career
- Allegiance: United Kingdom
- Branch: British Army
- Rank: Second Lieutenant
- Unit: Royal Horse Guards

Sir Richard Clive Butler DL (12 January 1929 – 28 January 2012) was a British farmer and merchant banker, President of the National Farmers' Union of England and Wales.

== Early life ==
One of the sons of the Conservative politician Rab Butler, by his marriage to Sydney Elizabeth Courtauld, daughter and co-heiress of Samuel Courtauld, the young Butler was educated at Eton College and Pembroke College, Cambridge, and was commissioned as a second lieutenant into the Royal Horse Guards.

The Courtaulds owned estates in north Essex, and on completing his National service, Butler concerned himself with estate management.

== Career ==
Butler became a farmer in 1953 and inherited a 1500-acre arable estate in Essex on the death of his mother in 1954. He was an active member of the National Farmers' Union of England and Wales, joining its council in 1962. In 1970, he became vice-president, and in 1971 deputy president to Henry Plumb, continuing almost until the end of the 1970s. He was then president from 1979 to 1986.

He was knighted in the 1981 Birthday Honours, and the knighthood was conferred by H. M. the Queen at Buckingham Palace on 10 November 1981.

After retiring from the NFU for a year, Butler was president of COPA, the union of European farmers, and also took on business directorships. In the City of London, he became a director of County Natwest Investment Management and served as chairman from 1989 to 1996.

Butler listed his recreations in Who's Who as “hunting, shooting, DIY” and was chairman of the East Essex Hunt for forty years.

== Personal life ==
On 5 July 1952, Butler married Susan Anne Maud Walker, a daughter of Patrick Bruce Walker and Sybil Middleton Turner. They had a daughter, Antonia Mary (1954), and twin sons, Richard Michael and Christopher Patrick (1956).

== Honours ==
- High Sheriff of Essex, 1969
- Deputy Lieutenant of Essex, 1972
- Knight Bachelor, 1981
