= David Hallam =

British politician (born 1948)

David Hallam FRSA
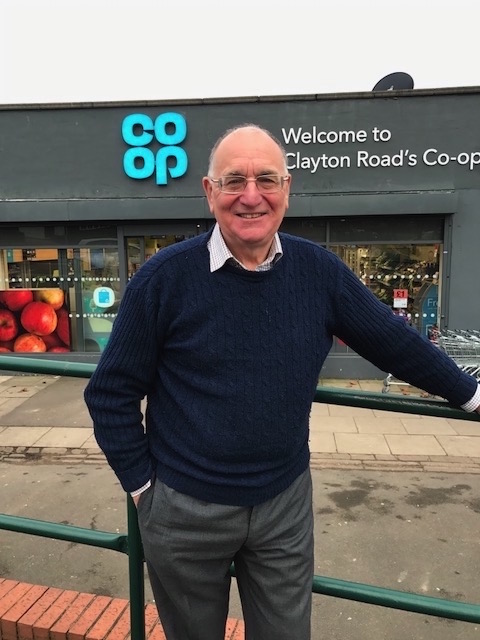
- Hallam in 2018

Member of the European Parliament for Herefordshire and Shropshire
- In office 9 June 1994 – 10 June 1999
- Preceded by: Constituency established
- Succeeded by: Constituency abolished

Personal details
- Born: 1948 (age 77–78)
- Party: Labour
- Profession: Politician

David John Alfred Hallam is a British Labour Party politician and writer. He is the former Member of the European Parliament (MEP) for the Herefordshire and Shropshire constituency in England, in the 1994–1999 European Parliament.

He is a Methodist Local Preacher. He is a trustee of his local church, a Life Member of the National Union of Journalists, a Patron of the Birmingham Museum and Art Gallery, an Honorary Vice President of the Severn Valley Railway Holdings plc, and a Fellow of the Royal Society of Arts.

He represents the West Midlands on the National Members' Council of the Co-op Group, the UK's largest ethical retailer. He contributes a weekly television and radio review column to the Methodist Recorder. He has used his reviews as the basis of a book "The Year The Queen Died: a media diary of 2022".

== Early life and career ==
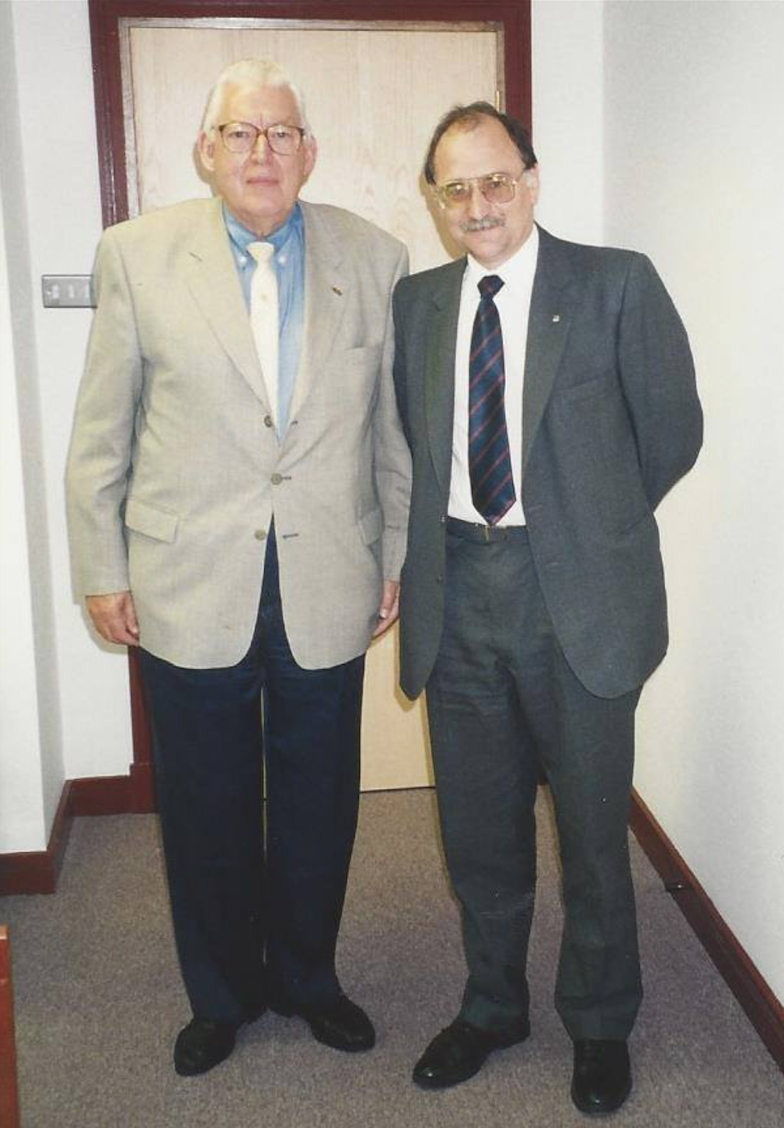
The Reverend Dr Ian Paisley MEP and David Hallam MEP meet at Stormont, to discuss the crisis at Drumcre, July 1996

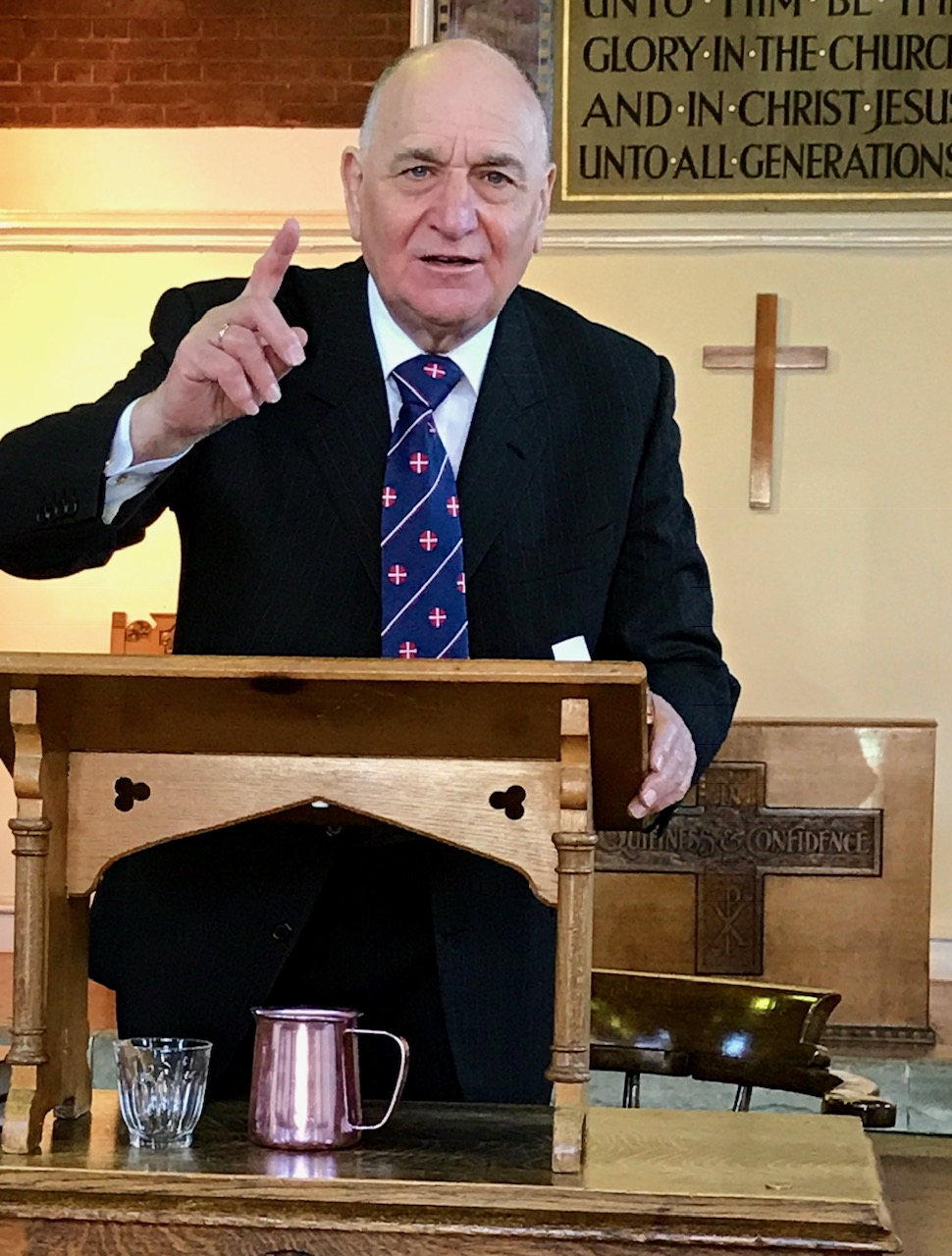
David Hallam leading a service at City Road Methodist Church Birmingham in 2019

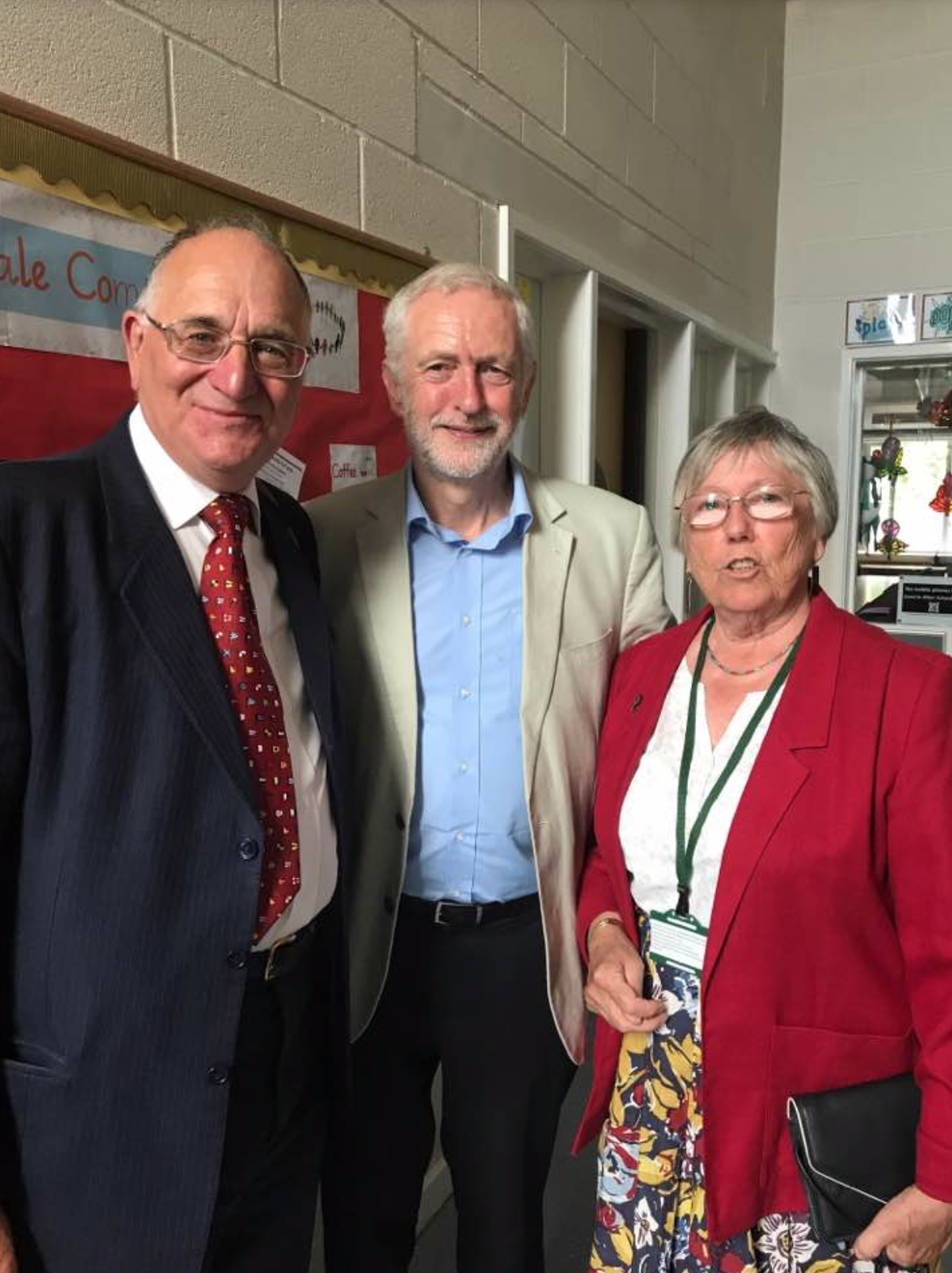
Hallam meeting with Jeremy Corbyn and local councillor Beryl Mason in Shropshire, 2017

Hallam was educated at Upton House Secondary School in Hackney, and then at the University of Sussex. He spoke with an East London, or Cockney, accent and remarked in later life that when speaking through interpretation at the European Parliament it was the first occasion that the social nuances of his accent did not matter.

In 1972, at the height of The Troubles, he joined an ecumenical playgroup scheme in Belfast working in both the Ardoyne and Shankhill Road areas. Whilst working as press officer with Birmingham City Council he handled the complex issues which arose following the pub bombings in the city on 21 November 1975 in which twenty one people were killed.

Hallam campaigned in the 1975 European Referendum in Smethwick, where he lived. He stood unsuccessfully for the Labour Party in Solihull in the 1979 General Election. He served on Sandwell Metropolitan Borough Council. He set up a publicity business, also becoming a Methodist Local Preacher.

In 1984 Hallam confronted a gunman during a shooting incident at the headquarters of the National Children's Home in Highbury, London, where he then worked

By profession, David Hallam is a public relations specialist. He has worked for several organisations including the Birmingham City Council, the National Children's Home, the National Health Service and the Ceramic and Allied Trades Union. He is a member of the Chartered Institute of Public Relations, the Chartered Institute of Marketing, and the National Union of Journalists.

In 2015 he graduated from the University of Birmingham with a Master of Arts degree in West Midlands history.

== Election to the European Parliament ==
Hallam first stood for the European Parliament in 1984 for the Shropshire and Stafford constituency; he stood again in 1989 and was elected on revised boundaries in 1994 for what was widely held to be a safe Conservative seat.

During his five-year mandate Hallam was one of the Parliament's most assiduous members, attending every session and recording votes on over 99% of all possible occasions.

In the Parliament he served on the Committee on Agriculture and Rural Development, was a substitute member of the committees on budgets and regional policy, the EU-ACP parliamentary assembly, on the standing delegation to the Israeli Knesset, the EU-Slovak joint parliamentary committee and President of the members' monthly prayer breakfast.

He expressed scepticism of proposals to remove nickel from coinage following the 1994 EU Nickel Directive, citing an EU Scientific Committee for Toxicity and Ecotoxicity of Chemical Compounds report which said that there was "no evidence...of sensitisation" from coinage containing nickel. He represented a constituency that hosted a nickel production plant, dismissing concerns about nickel allergy as "nonsense based on anecdote and prejudice", and predicted the rights-holder of the nickel-free Nordic gold alloy "will do very well".

== Parliamentary Roles ==
=== Agriculture and Rural Development Committee ===
Hallam was on this committee for the whole of his mandate and drafted several reports or opinions on its behalf.

- Proposal amending Regulation establishing a support system for certain arable crops A4-0378/96;
- The agri-monetary system for the single market A0261/97;
- Proposal to establish an integrated administration and control system for certain community aid schemes A4-0019/94;
- Proposal to amend the directive for the conservation of wild birds A4-0337/95;
- The application of EU directives on homeopathic medicinal products A4-0378/98.

=== Regional Policy Committee ===
Hallam was on this committee for the first half of his mandate and drafted two opinions on its behalf:

- Europe and the global information society (interim report) A4-0073/94 and (full report) A4-0244/96;
- Guidelines for trans-European telecommunications networks A4-0336/95.

Hallam's constituency benefited from Objective 5B, Objective 2, and Leader II regional funds.

=== EU-Slovak Joint Parliamentary Committee ===
Hallam was a member on this then newly formed committee to assist in the accession of Slovakia to the European Union. In October 1996 he travelled with the committee to Bratislava which had a mandate from the European Parliament to challenge Prime Minister Vladimir Meciar on his disturbing human rights violations. Hallam's intervention made front-page news in Slovakia.

=== Delegation to Israel ===
Hallam visited Israel several times with this standing delegation. He made it clear that his top priority would be to encourage peace and trade. "Building trade links is a good investment because when the peace process is complete there are ambitious Israeli and Arab plans for the Jordan Basin to become an economic powerhouse for the entire region".

=== ACP-EU Joint Parliamentary Assembly ===
This Assembly was established by the EU and 78 states from the African, Caribbean and Pacific regions. Hallam was a substitute member, standing in for colleague John Hume at the 21st, 24th, 27th and 28th sessions.

=== Members' Prayer Breakfast ===
Hallam was President of the members' prayer breakfast which met each month when the Parliament convened in Strasbourg. He met separately with the Northern Irish politician and cleric Ian Paisley regularly at a time when this was seen to be politically risky. In July 1996 Hallam flew to Belfast to discuss the Drumcree conflict with Ian Paisley in a bid to avert serious bloodshed.

== Controversy ==
=== Clause IV ===
Hallam was one of many Labour Party members who opposed Labour leader Tony Blair's re-writing of the common ownership Clause IV in the Labour Party constitution. He set out his views in a paper that was widely circulated within the Labour Party entitled Common Ownership and Social Justice which drew heavily on Hallam's Christian Socialist beliefs. He clashed with Tony Blair himself when Blair met the European Parliamentary Labour Party.

=== Introduction of the regional list system for electing British MEPs ===
In 1998 the Labour government introduced the "regional list" system for electing MEPs. In an affirmative ballot 95% of Labour Party members in his constituency endorsed Hallam's selection. However, there is significant independent academic evidence that Labour's selection procedure for the final list was heavily weighted specifically against those MEPs who had opposed the re-writing of Clause IV. Hallam was placed in fifth place on Labour's list for the West Midlands but the party was only allocated three seats following the 1999 European Parliamentary Elections. Hallam, together with colleague Christine Oddy, was effectively replaced by actor Michael Cashman and housing director Neena Gill. Labour Party members in the West Midlands were angry that Hallam and Oddy had been pushed aside.

== Harold Williams ==
Shortly after his election Hallam took up the case of Harold "Ginger" Williams who had been convicted of the murder of Dorothy Margaret Davies in her house on Whitern Way, Hereford in January 1977. Williams was convicted the following November and had been in prison ever since, refusing the terms of parole that would have meant him acknowledging his guilt.

Hallam's staff reviewed the available evidence and submitted a dossier to the Criminal Law Review Commission who then referred the case to the Court of Appeal. Williams however died just weeks before the case was due to be heard. At the time Hallam commented "He was my first constituency case. He was also my last. I continued with it even after I had lost my seat. This has really broken our hearts. It’s terrible after more than 23 years in custody, with just weeks to go before his name could finally be cleared, that he has died. It is a tragedy".

== Personal life ==
Hallam married Claire Vanstone in 1988. They have three children.

== In popular culture ==
When Hallam was elected as an MEP in 1994 he was in the same congregation at City Road Methodist Church, Birmingham as hymn writer Martin Leckebusch. Leckebusch's hymn "Called by Christ to be disciples" has been included as hymn number 660 in the UK's Methodist Church hymnbook, Singing the Faith, published in 2013. According to the website supporting the new hymnbook "Martin found himself asking the question: What’s it going to be like for David as an MEP in Europe? How will he be a Christian disciple in that new role?.... Martin started to reflect on the different roles that individual members of a congregation fulfil in their 'day jobs' and how these may become part of their Christian calling".

Hallam's book Taking on the Men: the first women parliamentary candidates 1918 provided the basis for the December edition of ITV's political programme in the Midlands, Central Lobby. Hallam provided an interview and background material.

Hallam appeared on ITV's Good Morning Britain in July 2016 to speak about City Road Methodist Church, Birmingham becoming a Pokémon Go gym.

== Publications ==
=== Eliza Asbury ===
- Eliza Asbury, her cottage and her son, Bewdley, 2003.

Eliza Asbury lived between Birmingham and the Black Country during the ferment of the vast eighteenth century industrial revolution that was to transform the world. She had a difficult marriage, lost a beloved daughter in infancy and lived in a community at Great Barr where hostility to her Methodist faith was never far from the surface.

Nevertheless, for over fifty years her little cottage was a regular place of worship and her only son Frank was to go to America to become Bishop Francis Asbury, the first Protestant Bishop in North America.

This book tells the inspiring story through Eliza's eyes, uncoupling many of the myths that have grown up about the Asbury family. Using original sources it charts the frustrating thirty year correspondence between mother and son, when letters sometimes took a year to arrive at the intended destination.

=== One hundred years of service to Newton ===
- One hundred years of service to Newton, the history of Newton Road United Reformed (Allen Memorial) Church 1917-2017, Smethwick, 2018.

The Newton Road United Reformed Church closed its doors for the last time on Christmas Day 2017. It had been started exactly one hundred years before, but its history goes back to the 1740s when the early Methodists proselytised in Great Barr. David Hallam tells the story of a small church that had a great impact in its neighbourhood. Available to download here.

=== Taking on the Men, the first women parliamentary candidates 1918 ===
- Taking on the Men: the first women parliamentary candidates 1918, Bewdley 2018.

The first General Election after British women won the right to vote in 1918 was almost an entirely male affair.

With just days to spare before the old Parliament dissolved, legislation was rushed through that enabled female candidates to stand. Women scrambled to be nominated, but only seventeen made it onto the ballot paper.

Three were in the West Midlands. Christabel Pankhurst (Smethwick) is probably the best known of them now. But, at the time, Mary Macarthur (Stourbridge), and Margery Corbett Ashby (Ladywood) were equally capable of making headline news... and often did.

Ranged against them were all the forces of tradition and rigid conservatism, determined that women candidates should fail.

Taking On the Men is a fascinating, superbly researched and thoroughly well-told tale of three women who took on the men and – simply by standing for Parliament – scored a small victory against what would now be known as ‘the patriarchy’.

Contains biographies and results for the seventeen women to contest the 1918 General Election.

Introduction by Preet Gill MP, the UK's first woman Sikh Member of Parliament.

== Selected online articles ==
=== The Arts ===
- Ballet could be set to capture a big audience in Birmingham Birmingham Mail 13 April 2020, online Birmingham Live 13 April 2020

=== Political ===
- Immigration: a question of colour? Immigration - a question of colour] Methodist Recorder 13 March 2020.
- Business as usual no longer an option for Labour, Methodist Recorder, 10 January 2020.
- Why the December 1918 General Election was so important Birmingham Evening Mail, 11 December 2019, online Birmingham Live, 12 December 2019
- The Birmingham Pub Bombings: 45 year struggle for justice Birmingham Evening Mail 21 November 2019, online Birmingham Live 21 November 2019.
- Christabel Pankhurst in Smethwick 1918 Transactions of the Staffordshire Archaeological and History Society Vol L, December 2018.
- Labour should prepare for the 2019 European elections, LabourList, 30 May, 2018.
- The odd couple: the Labour man who prayed with Ian Paisley, Chamberlain Files, 24 September 2014 A hard copy version of this article also appeared the same day in the Methodist Recorder.
- Meeting Margaret, the many faces of Thatcher, Chamberlain Files, 16 April 2013.

=== Methodism ===
- A Life of contradictions in early American Methodism - a review of Jane Donovan's biography of Henry Foxall Pulse 1 August 2020, a hard copy version of this story appeared in the Methodist Recorder, 31 July 2020.
- Old words with new meanings David Hallam recalls when "furlough" was an important word in non-conformist culture. Pulse 22 May 2020. A hard copy version of this story appeared in the Methodist Recorder, 22 May 2020.
- Opening doors, opening hearts, opening minds - David Hallam reflects on his role as a steward at the Methodist Conference. Methodist Recorder, 19 July 2019.
- Why Methodists should embrace the Co-op Pulse, 9 February 2018. A hard copy version of this article also appeared the same day in the Methodist Recorder.

=== Professional ===
- A press officer, murdered Iraqis and Pokemon Go Pulse, 31 July 2016.
- Hallam's Iron Law of Online Forums: From Promised Land to Ghost Town, Pulse, 25 January 2016.
- How an interim uses downtime to build a career, Pulse, 25 November 2014.
- How to lobby candidates in a general election - and what to avoid, Pulse, 13 November 2014.
- Dear interviewer, Pulse 4 November 2014.
- How to speak in public through interpretation, Pulse 9 October 2014.
- Veteran Labour press officer on the art of communication: 'We frame a version of the truth', Chamberlain Files, 24 September 2013.

== Archives ==
Hallam's papers for his period as an MEP, 1994–1999, are held at the Shropshire County Archives in Shrewsbury.
