= Herefordshire and Shropshire (European Parliament constituency) =

Former European Parliament constituency

- European Parliament constituency
- Boundary within the West Midlands (1994-1999)
- Member state: United Kingdom
- Created: 1994
- Dissolved: 1999
- MEPs: 1

Prior to its uniform adoption of proportional representation in 1999, the United Kingdom used first-past-the-post for the European elections in England, Scotland and Wales. The European Parliament constituencies used under that system were smaller than the later regional constituencies and only had one Member of the European Parliament each.

The constituency of Herefordshire and Shropshire was one of them.

It consisted of the Westminster Parliament constituencies (on their 1983 boundaries) of Hereford, Leominster, Ludlow, North Shropshire, Shrewsbury and Atcham, The Wrekin, and Wyre Forest.

David Hallam of the Labour Party was the sole MEP for this constituency's entire existence. His narrow election in 1994 over the Conservative incumbent Christopher Prout was somewhat of an upset; the area had been widely assumed to be safely Conservative.

== MEPs ==
Election	Member	Party
1994	David Hallam	Labour

== Election results ==
European Parliament election, 1994: Herefordshire and Shropshire
Party	Candidate	Votes	%	±%
Labour	David Hallam	76,120	36.7	
Conservative	Sir Christopher Prout	74,270	35.8	
Liberal Democrats	John Y. Gallagher	44,130	21.2	
Green	Miss Felicity M. Norman	11,578	5.6	
Natural Law	Titus W. Mercer	1,480	0.7	
Majority		1,850	0.9	
Turnout		207,578		
Labour win (new seat)				
