= Shropshire and Stafford (European Parliament constituency) =

Former European Parliament constituency

- European Parliament constituency
- Boundary within the West Midlands (1984-1994)
- Member state: United Kingdom
- Created: 1984
- Dissolved: 1994
- MEPs: 1

Prior to its uniform adoption of proportional representation in 1999, the United Kingdom used first-past-the-post for the European elections in England, Scotland and Wales. The European Parliament constituencies used under that system were smaller than the later regional constituencies and only had one Member of the European Parliament each.

The constituency of Shropshire and Stafford was one of them.

It consisted of the Westminster Parliament constituencies (on their 1983 boundaries) of Cannock and Burntwood, Ludlow, Newcastle-under-Lyme, North Shropshire, Shrewsbury and Atcham, South Staffordshire, Stafford, and The Wrekin.

Lord Kingsland, then Christopher Prout, was the sole representative during this constituency's existence.

== MEPs ==
Elected	Member	Party
1984	Christopher Prout	Conservative
1994	Constituency abolished	

== Election results ==
European Parliament election, 1984: Shropshire and Stafford
Party	Candidate	Votes	%	±%
Conservative	Christopher Prout	82,291	46.5	
Labour	David J. A. Hallam	57,359	32.5	
Liberal	Richard M. Burman	37,209	21.0	
Majority		24,932	14.0	
Turnout		176,859	31.4	
Conservative win (new seat)				

European Parliament election, 1989: Shropshire and Stafford
Party	Candidate	Votes	%	±%
Conservative	Christopher Prout	85,896	41.0	−5.5
Labour	David J. A. Hallam	83,353	39.8	+7.3
Green	Robert T. C. Saunders	29,637	14.2	New
SLD	Clifford G. Hards	10,568	5.0	−16.0
Majority		2,543	1.2	−12.8
Turnout		209,454	35.0	+3.6
Conservative hold		Swing		
