= Saralees Nadarajah =

Statistician

- Nadarajah in 2024
- Education: University of Zimbabwe; University of Sheffield
- Known for: Extreme value theory; Nonparametric statistics; Information theory
- Scientific career
- Fields: Statistics
- Workplaces: University of Nebraska–Lincoln; University of South Florida; University of Manchester
- Thesis: Multivariate Extreme Value Methods with Applications to Reservoir Flood Safety. (1994)
- Doctoral advisor: Jonathan Angus Tawn; Clyde W. Anderson

Saralees Nadarajah is a British statistician and researcher specialising in distribution theory, extreme value theory, nonparametric statistics, and their applications. He is also a professor at the Department of Mathematics, University of Manchester and has worked at the Department of Statistics at the University of Nebraska-Lincoln, the University of South Florida and the University of Plymouth.

== Early life and education ==
Nadarajah was born in Sri Lanka and grew up in Zimbabwe. He obtained his B.Sc. in mathematics from the University of Zimbabwe in Harare. Nadarajah earned his M.Sc. and Ph.D. degrees in statistics from the University of Sheffield in the UK, in 1991 and 1994 respectively.

== Career ==
As of April 2025, Nadarajah is a professor at the Department of Mathematics, University of Manchester. He was previously affiliated with the Department of Statistics, University of Nebraska–Lincoln and the University of South Florida.

In 2021, during the Covid-19 pandemic when lectures were being delivered remotely, first-year mathematics students at the University of Manchester raised roughly £50 through crowdfunding to purchase Nadarajah a new visualiser after complaints about the image quality of his Zoom lectures. Nadarajah had stated in his lectures that the university did not provide him with funds to purchase equipment for online teaching, although some students later refuted this claim.

In 2026, Nadarajah was recognised at the Students' Union Academic Awards, winning the award for "Exceptional Student Support". He had previously, in the 2024 awards, been highly commended for inclusive and accessible teaching practice, dedication to making student-led change, innovative implementation of digital/flexible learning and outstanding postgraduate research supervision. Nadarajah is known for his unusually intensive approach to student contact; telephoning and emailing students who had missed or performed poorly in assignments. He has stated in an interview that he works weekends and values 24/7 accessibility to help individual students.

A 2014 teaching evaluation showed that Nadarajah marked 200 tests in 24 hours.

Nadarajah is the founder of Educate Africa charity which he started in 2017 to improve higher education in Africa. As part of this project, he teaches free-of-charge statistics lessons to postgraduate students at the University of Zimbabwe. Nadarajah also co-organised the "Black Heroes of Statistical Research" workshop, which took place in November 2023 to foster collaboration among the African-based statistical community.

== Research ==
Nadarajah specializes in statistical fields including extreme value and distribution theory, nonparametric statistics, information theory, and reliability. His expertise also extends to sampling theory, statistical software development, and time series analysis. Nadarajah-Haghighi (UNH) class of distribution, an extension of the exponential distribution, is named after him.

== Awards and recognition ==
- Jacob Wolfowitz Prize (2007)
- University of Manchester Education Award (2021)

== Selected publications ==
- Extreme value distributions: theory and applications (2000)
- Multivariate t-distributions and their applications (2004)
- Handbook of beta distribution and its applications (2004)
- A generalized normal distribution (2005)
- The beta exponential distribution (2006)
- Lindley distribution and its application (2008)
- On the inefficiency of Bitcoin (2017)
