= Russell P. Hughes =

American-British chemist (born 1946)

Russell P. Hughes (born December 23, 1946) an American/British chemist, is the Frank R. Mori Professor Emeritus and research professor in the Department of Chemistry at Dartmouth College. His research interests are in organometallic chemistry, with emphasis on the chemistry of transition metal complexes interacting with fluorocarbons. His research group's work in this area led to several creative syntheses of complexes of transition metal and perfluorinated hydrocarbon fragments.

== Education ==
Hughes was born on December 23, 1946, in Denbigh, Wales, the son of Elliot and Joan (Profit) Hughes. He earned his B.Sc. at the University of Manchester Institute of Science and Technology, and his Ph.D. at the University of Toronto under John Powell. He held postdoctoral fellowships at the University of Bristol in Michael Green's laboratory and at McGill University with John Harrod.

== Research career ==
Hughes began his independent scientific career as an assistant professor at Dartmouth College in 1976. He was promoted to associate professor in 1982, and Professor in 1986. He chaired the department of Chemistry from 1991 to 1994. In 1999, he was appointed to be the Inaugural Frank R. Mori Professor in the Arts & Sciences. His research has centered on organometallic chemistry, with focus on the chemistry of transition metal complexes interacting with fluorocarbons and the organometallic chemistry of small organic rings. After 35 years of experimental work, he transitioned to computational chemistry and collaborative research.

== Honors ==
Hughes is a Fellow of the Alfred P. Sloan Foundation, the American Chemical Society, the American Association for the Advancement of Science, the Alexander von Humboldt Foundation, and the Royal Society of Chemistry. The American Chemical Society awarded him the Award for Creative Work in Fluorine Chemistry in 2010.

== Research highlights ==
=== Metal complexes of octafluorocyclooctatetraene (OFCOT) ===
One of Hughes’ research interests focused on the study of transition metal complexes with octafluorocyclooctatetraene (OFCOT), and the comparison of the structural features of these complexes to the hydrocarbon counterpart of OFCOT cyclooctatetraene (COT). One striking difference in the coordination complexes of OFCOT is that their thermal stability and resistance to dynamic rearrangements in binding geometry (diminished fluxional character) compared to COT analogs. These differences can be rationalized based on the relative thermodynamic stability of the isomers computed using density functional theory (DFT).

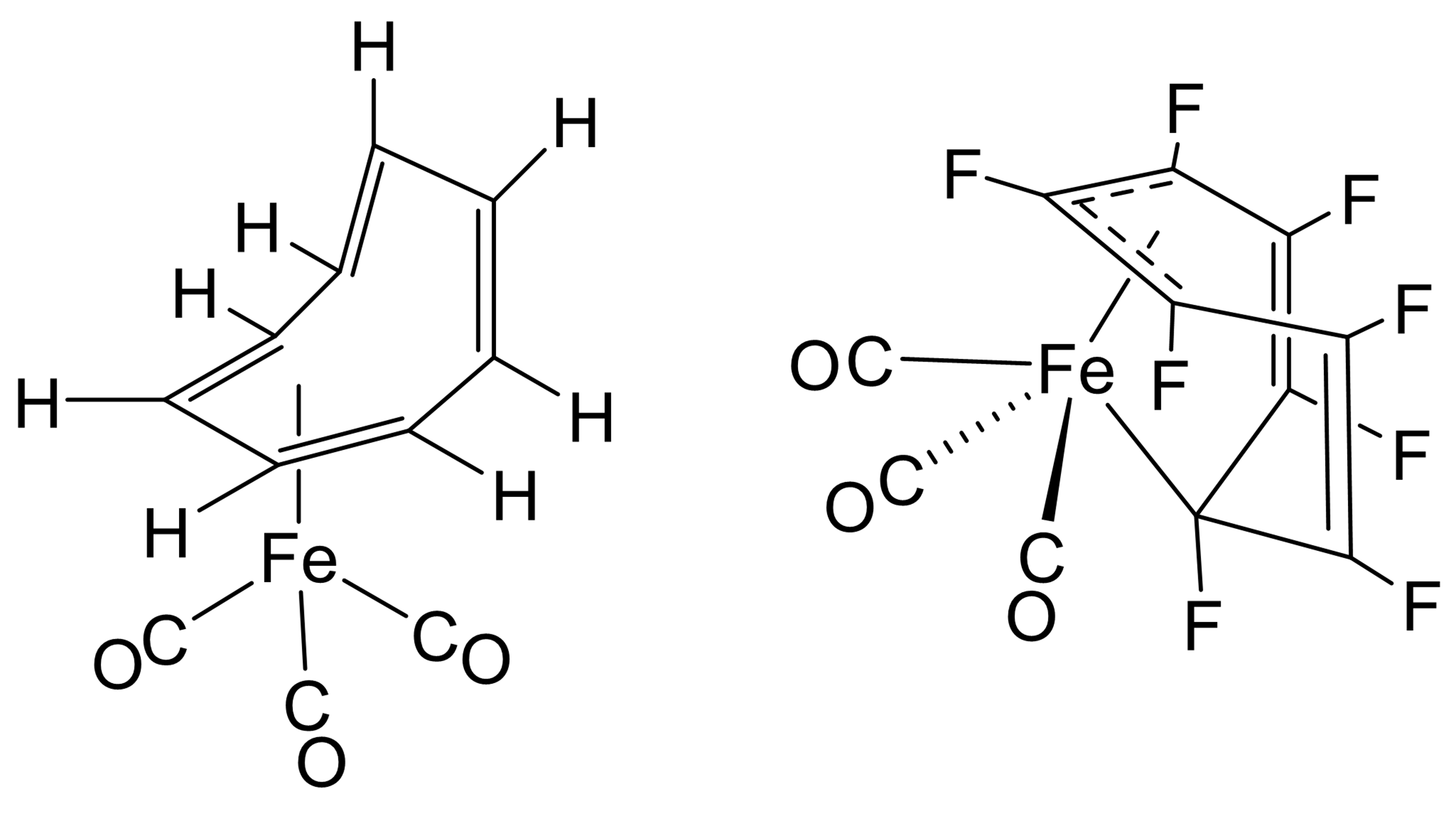
Differences in interactions of transition metals with cyclooctatetraene (COT) vs octafluorocyclooctatetraene (OFCOT)

=== Complexes of perfluorocyclopentadienyl ligand ===
In 1992, Hughes and coworkers used flash vacuum pyrolysis (at 770 °C) to extrude CO from an oxacyclohexadienyl complex afford the first metallocene containing a perfluorinated cyclopentadienyl ring, η^{5}-C_{5}F_{5}. Ruthenocene and its perfluorocyclopentadienyl analog were compared. It was observed that the C_{5}F_{5} interaction with Ru results in a shorter distance between this ring and Ru, compared to the hydrocarbon analog.

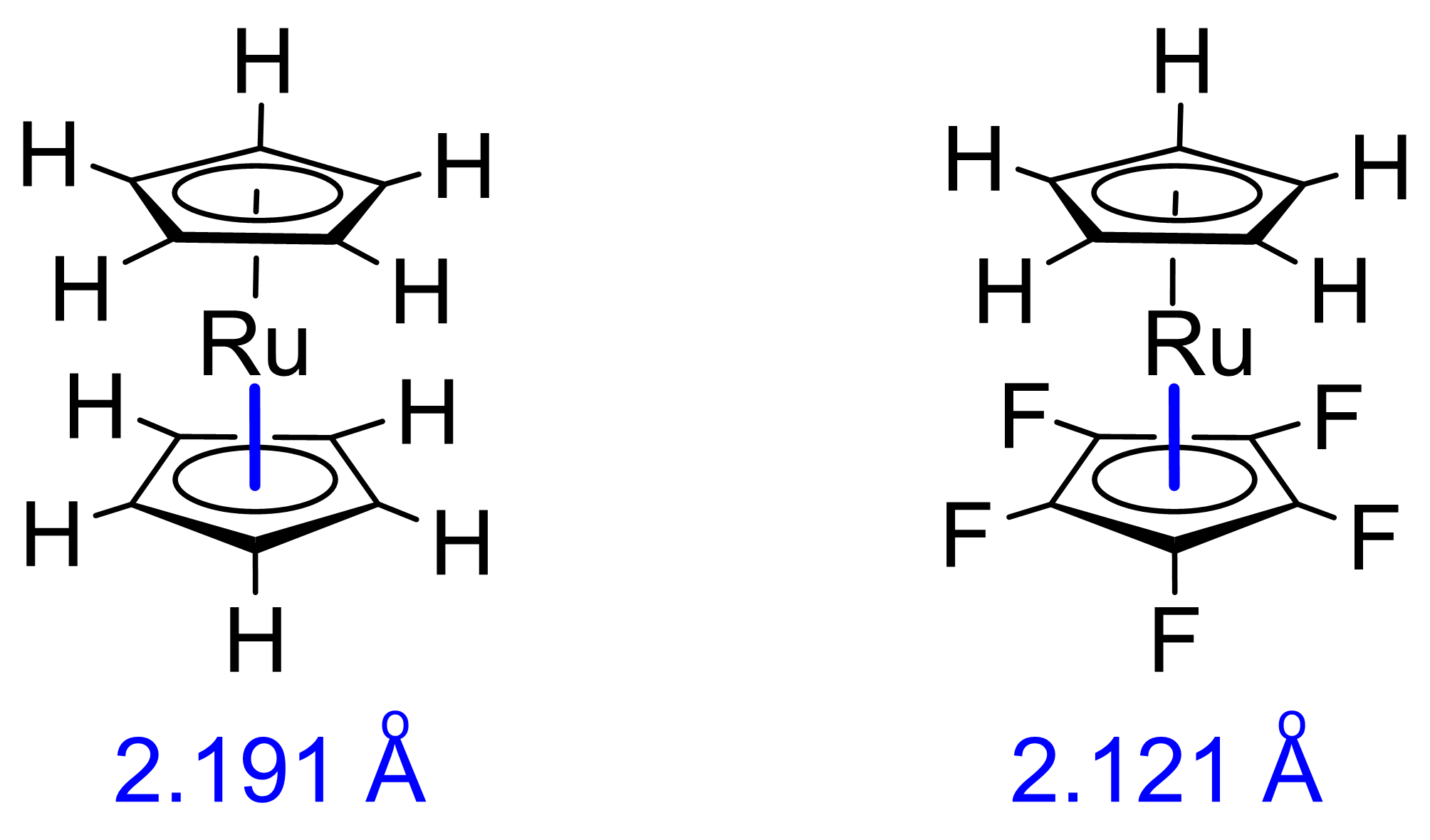
Structural differences in ruthenocene to its perfluorocyclopentadienyl analog

=== Perfluorobenzyne complexes ===
Hughes and coworkers synthesized to the first transition metal complex of perfluorobenzyne (C_{6}F_{4}).

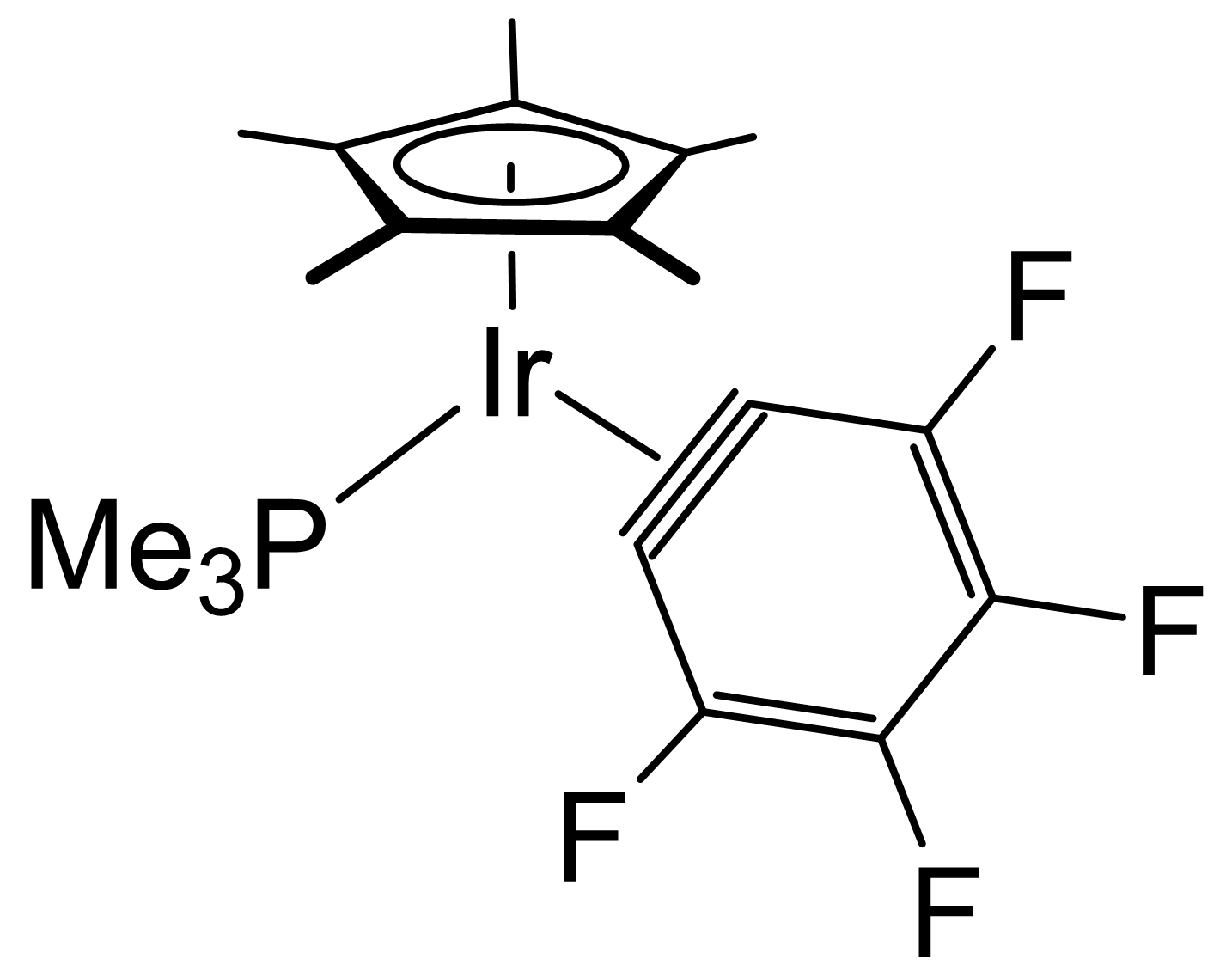
perfluorobenzyne

=== Perfluorocarbene Complexes ===
In 2005, through an inner-sphere reduction reaction of perfluoroalkyl ligands Hughes and coworkers provided a novel and useful route to difluorocarbene and perfluoroalkylidene complexes. This was followed in 2007 by the synthesis of the first, and so far, the only, example of a carbene ligand bearing two strongly electron withdrawing perfluoroalkyl groups.

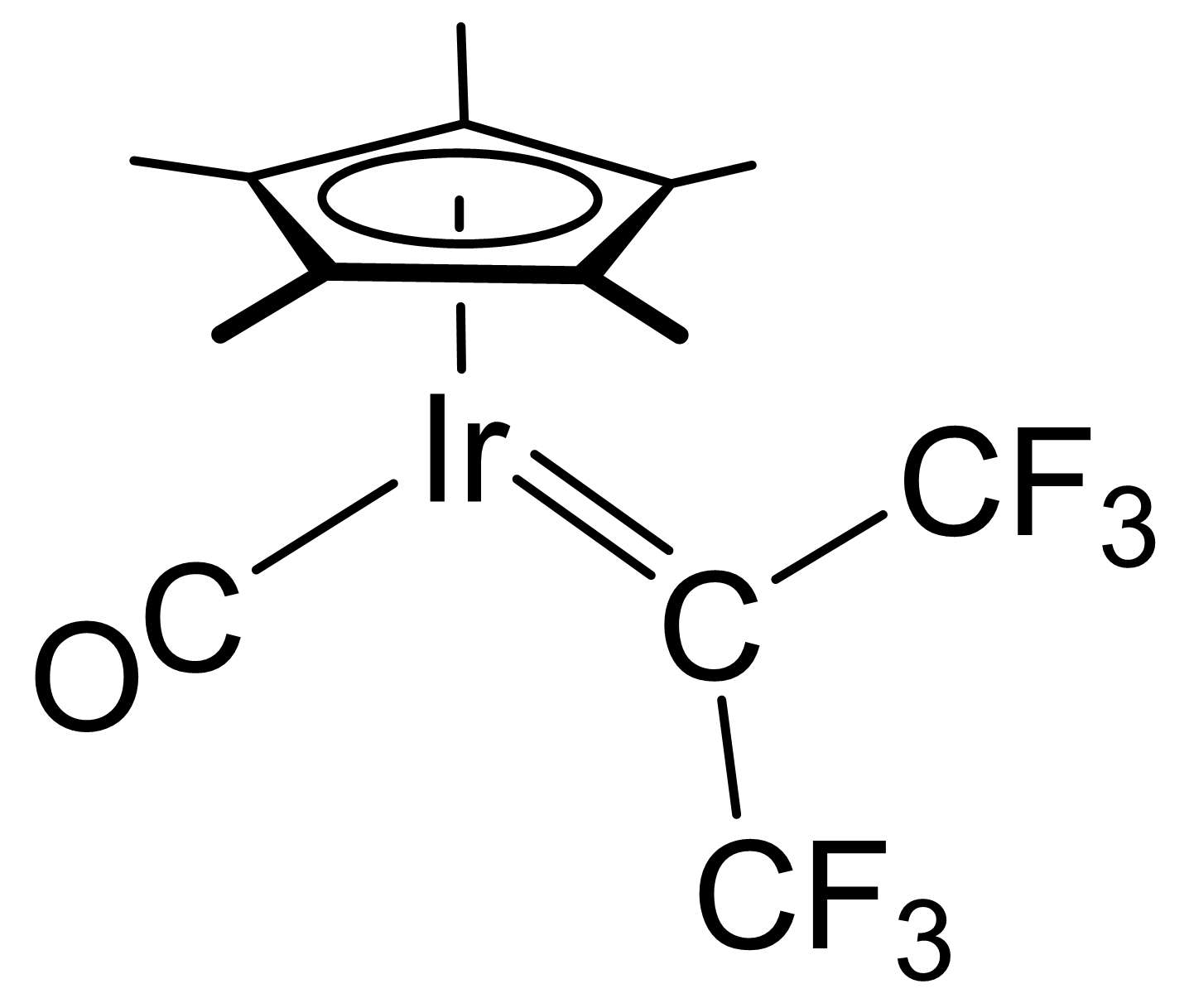
perfluorocarbene complex

== = Complex of fluoromethyne ==
In 2006, Hughes and coworkers prepared a complex of CF by reduction of a Mo-trifluoromethyl complex.

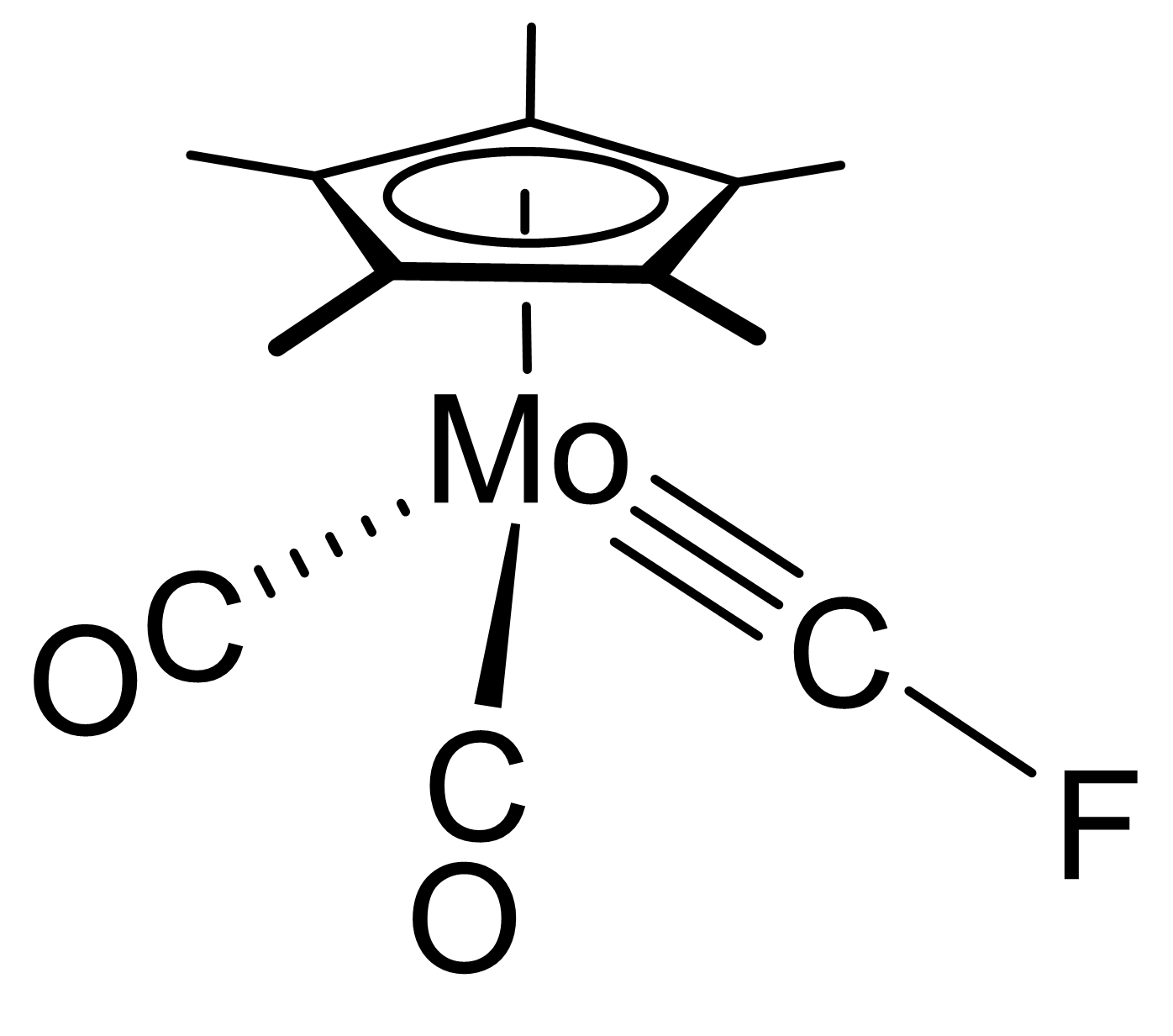
simplest fluorocarbon as ligand
