= John Webster Bride =

English surgeon (1884–1963)

John Webster Bride (1884–1963) was a consultant surgeon at St. Mary's Hospital in Manchester, gynaecological surgeon at the Northern Hospital for Women and Children, Manchester, and lecturer in obstetrics and gynaecology at Manchester University.

== Early life and education ==
He was born in Wilmslow, where his father practised medicine. He studied medicine at Manchester University and the University of London, receiving M.D. degrees from both institutions.

== Career ==
During the First World War, he served as an officer with the Royal Army Medical Corps in the Gallipoli campaign, the Near East and France.

Following the war, he worked at St. Mary's Hospital, where he was appointed consultant surgeon in 1921. He was honorary gynaecologist at Manchester Northern Hospital, and after the creation of the National Health Service, became consultant gynaecologist for United Manchester Hospitals. He lectured in obstetrics and gynaecology at the University of Manchester, wrote a history of St. Mary's Hospital, and was a member of Manchester Medical Society. He served as president of the North of England Obstetrical and Gynaecological Society.

He was a foundation fellow of the Royal College of Obstetricians and Gynaecologists.

In his personal life, he was interested in history, in particular the study of ancient buildings. He was married and had two children.

His papers are held in the archives of the Manchester University Library.

== Selected publications ==
Bride JW. Discussion on Rupture of the Cæsarean Section Scar in Subsequent Pregnancy or Labour Proc R Soc Med. 1921;14(Obstet Gynaecol Sect):148-9

Bride JW. An Investigation of a Series of 100 Ovarian Tumours. Trans Edinb Obstet Soc. 1930;50:32-51

Bride JW. THE TUBERCULIN SKIN REACTION (VON PIRQUET'S). Br Med J. 1910 May 14;1(2576):1161. doi: 10.1136/bmj.1.2576.1161

Dougal D, Bride JW. Etiological Factors in Abortion: A Study of 100 Cases. Br Med J. 1920;1(3097):632-634. doi:10.1136/bmj.1.3097.632

Bride JW. HAEMORRHAGE IN ASSOCIATION WITH PREGNANCY, LABOUR, AND THE PUERPERIUM. Br Med J. 1925;2(3390):1176-1179. doi:10.1136/bmj.2.3390.1176

Bride JW. The Development of Vaginal Operations for Genital Prolapse. Br Med J. 1926;2(3424):361.
