= The Cotswolds (European Parliament constituency) =

Former European Parliament constituency

- European Parliament constituency
- Boundary within South West England (1979-1984)
- Member state: United Kingdom
- Created: 1979
- Dissolved: 1999
- MEPs: 1

The Cotswolds (sometimes called "Cotswolds") was a European Parliament constituency covering the counties of Gloucestershire and Oxfordshire in England.

Before uniform adoption of proportional representation in 1999, the United Kingdom used first-past-the-post for the European elections in Great Britain. The European Parliament constituencies used under that system were smaller than the later regional constituencies and only had one Member of the European Parliament each.

When it was created in 1979, it consisted of the Westminster Parliament constituencies of Banbury, Cheltenham, Cirencester and Tewkesbury, Gloucester, Mid Oxfordshire, Oxford and Stroud. From 1984 it consisted of Banbury, Cheltenham, Cirencester and Tewkesbury, Gloucester, Stratford-on-Avon, Stroud and Witney. From 1994 it consisted of Cheltenham, Cirencester and Tewkesbury, Gloucester, Stroud, West Gloucestershire and Witney.

Boundary within the West Midlands (1984-1994)

Boundary within South West England (1994-1999)

== Members of the European Parliament ==
| Elected | Name | Party |
|---|---|---|
| 1979 | Sir Henry (later Lord) Plumb | Conservative |

== Election results ==
European Parliament election, 1979: Cotswolds
| Party | Candidate | Votes | % | ±% |
|---|---|---|---|---|
| Conservative | Sir Henry Plumb | 109,139 | 58.6 | |
| Labour | Jim A. Honeybone | 37,713 | 20.3 | |
| Liberal | Muriel Eda Burton | 27,916 | 15.0 | |
| United Against the Common Market | Donald Bennett | 11,422 | 6.1 | |
| Majority | | 71,426 | 38.3 | |
| Turnout | | 186,190 | | |
| Conservative win (new seat) | | | | |

European Parliament election, 1984: Cotswolds
| Party | Candidate | Votes | % | ±% |
|---|---|---|---|---|
| Conservative | Sir Henry Plumb | 94,740 | 53.5 | −5.1 |
| Liberal | Muriel Eda Burton | 45,798 | 25.8 | +10.8 |
| Labour | Janet A. Royall | 36,738 | 20.7 | +0.4 |
| Majority | | 48,942 | 27.7 | −10.6 |
| Turnout | | 177,276 | | |
| Conservative hold | | Swing | | |

European Parliament election, 1989: Cotswolds
| Party | Candidate | Votes | % | ±% |
|---|---|---|---|---|
| Conservative | Lord Plumb | 94,852 | 45.1 | −8.4 |
| Green | Sue Limb | 49,174 | 23.4 | New |
| Labour | Tom Levitt | 48,180 | 22.9 | +2.2 |
| SLD | Leslie Anthony Rowe | 18,196 | 8.6 | −17.2 |
| Majority | | 45,678 | 21.7 | −6.0 |
| Turnout | | 210,402 | | |
| Conservative hold | | Swing | | |

European Parliament election, 1994: Cotswolds
| Party | Candidate | Votes | % | ±% |
|---|---|---|---|---|
| Conservative | Lord Plumb | 67,484 | 34.5 | −10.6 |
| Labour | Tess J. Kingham | 63,216 | 32.3 | +9.4 |
| Liberal Democrats | John C. Thomson | 44,269 | 22.7 | +14.1 |
| New Britain | Melvyn D. Rendell | 11,044 | 5.7 | New |
| Green | Duncan McCanlis | 8,254 | 4.2 | −19.2 |
| Natural Law | Henry W. Brighouse | 1,151 | 0.6 | New |
| Majority | | 4,268 | 2.2 | −19.5 |
| Turnout | | 195,418 | | |
| Conservative hold | | Swing | | |
