= Frank Hamilton Lacey =

Irish surgeon (1879–1958)

Frank Hamilton Lacey TD, FRCOG, (1879–1958) was an Irish surgeon and foundation fellow of the Royal College of Obstetricians and Gynaecologists.

== Early life and education ==
He was born 2 May 1879 in Dublin. His father was a physician; his mother was a direct descendant of Bennet Langton, and passed down letters and memorabilia from Samuel Johnson to her son. He graduated MB ChB from the University of Manchester (1906) and M.D. (1912). He then took up a position at Saint Mary's Hospital, Manchester.

== Military service ==
During World War I, he served with the Royal Army Service Corps in Egypt and the Dardanelles, and then served with the Royal Army Medical Corps in France. He retired as a major, and received the Territorial Decoration.

== Later life ==
After the war he was honorary surgeon at Saint Mary's Hospital, Manchester. He also was honorary gynaecologist to the Christie Hospital. He became a clinical lecturer in obstetrics and gynaecology at the University of Manchester.

He died at his home in Balcombe in 1958, survived by his wife Evelyn Rudge Lacey and their three children.
