= Christopher Prout, Baron Kingsland =

British politician (1942–2009)

The Right Honourable The Lord Kingsland TD PC QC
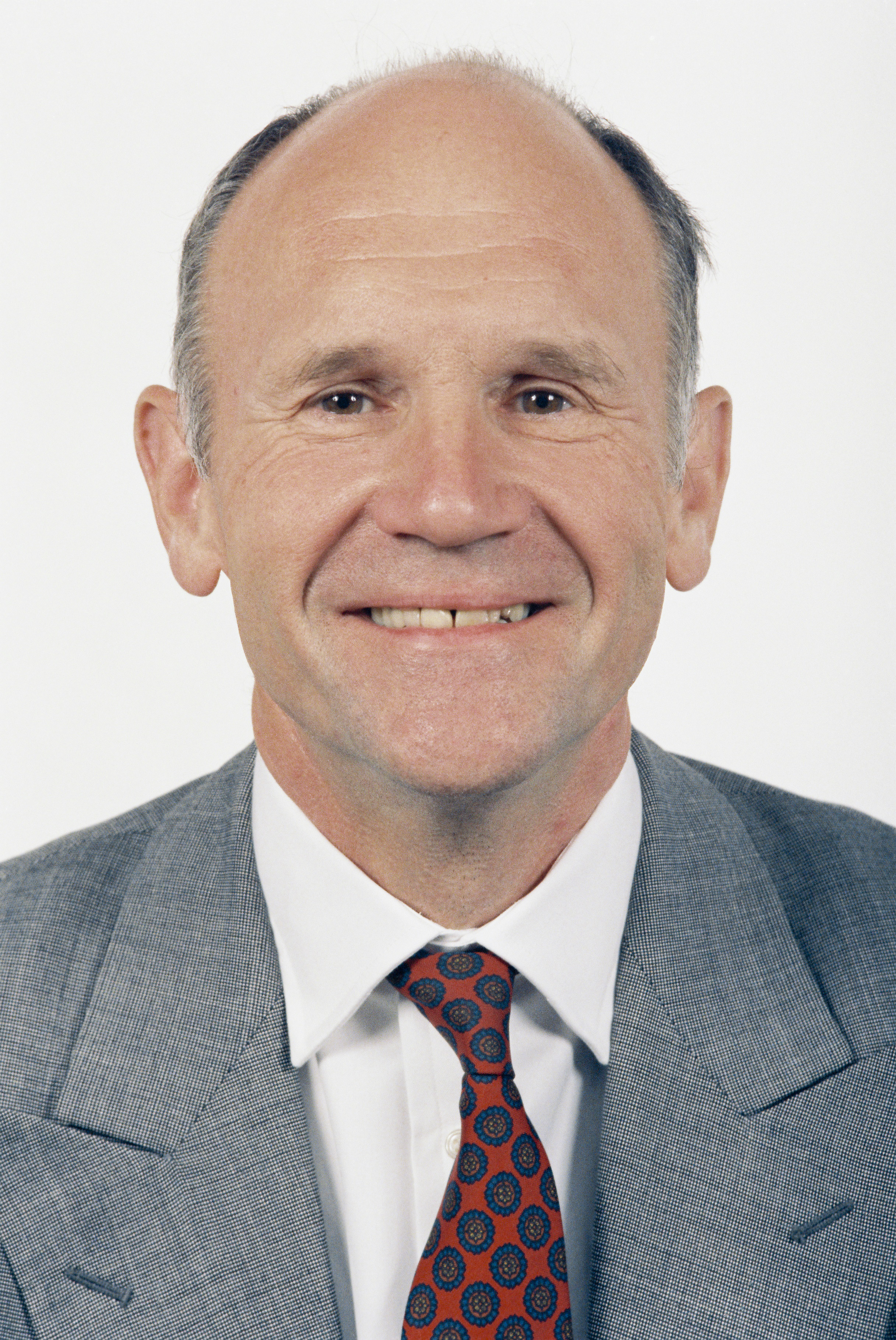
- Official portrait, 1989

Shadow Lord Chancellor
- In office 11 June 1997 – 12 July 2009
- Leader: William Hague; Iain Duncan Smith; Michael Howard; David Cameron
- Preceded by: The Lord Mackay of Clashfern
- Succeeded by: Jack Straw (2010)

Member of the House of Lords
- Lord Temporal
- Life peerage 7 October 1994 – 12 July 2009

Leader of the Conservatives in the European Parliament
- In office 7 July 1987 – 16 June 1994
- Preceded by: Henry Plumb
- Succeeded by: Tom Spencer

Member of the European Parliament for Shropshire and Stafford
- In office 14 June 1984 – 9 June 1994
- Preceded by: Constituency established
- Succeeded by: Constituency abolished

Member of the European Parliament for Salop and Stafford
- In office 7 June 1979 – 14 June 1984
- Preceded by: Constituency established
- Succeeded by: Constituency abolished

Personal details
- Born: Christopher James Prout; 1 January 1942 London, England
- Died: 12 July 2009 (aged 67)
- Party: Conservative
- Education: University of Manchester; Queen's College, Oxford; Columbia University; City Law School

Christopher James Prout, Baron Kingsland TD PC QC (1 January 1942 – 12 July 2009) was a British barrister and Conservative Party politician. He is perhaps most well known for serving as the leader of the Conservative group of Members of the European Parliament (MEPs) and his role in initiating their association with the European People's Party. He later became a noted expert on constitutional issues.

== Life outside politics ==
Prout was born in 1942, the son of Lucy and Frank Prout. He was educated at Sevenoaks School and Manchester University before gaining a postgraduate scholarship at The Queen's College, Oxford where he studied economics. He also spent one year at Columbia University, New York. In 1966 he joined the International Bank of Reconstruction and Development in Washington, D.C. for three years before taking up a research fellowship at Sussex University and then becoming a lecturer in Law. He was called to the Bar in 1972 and became a Bencher of the Middle Temple in 1996. He was made a Queen's Counsel in 1988 and continued practising at the Bar throughout his career in politics.

He was also a member of the Territorial Army serving with 16th/5th The Queen's Royal Lancers and on headquarters staff of the 3rd Armoured Division. He retired from the Territorial Army in 1987 and was rewarded with the Territorial Decoration. Prout also enjoyed sailing and gardening; he owned a Daring class yacht which won the Daily Telegraph Cup in 1987. He was Master of the Garden at the Middle Temple and was also the 2009 President of the Shropshire Horticultural Society.

== European Parliament ==
Prout was selected as the Conservative Party candidate for the Shropshire and Stafford constituency for the 1979 elections to the European Parliament, and won the seat with a 45,000 majority. Sitting as a member of the conservative European Democrats Group (ED), he was elected as the Conservative deputy whip and then four years later as the chief whip. In 1987, the ED chairman Henry Plumb was elected as President of the European Parliament. Prout won the election to succeed him, defeating Baroness Elles, Sir Fred Catherwood and Claus Toksvig.

Though he criticised the President of the European Commission Jacques Delors—describing his blueprint for the future European Union as trying to "graft superfluous social engineering" to the single market—Prout proved to be somewhat pro-European and was visibly uncomfortable with Margaret Thatcher's euroscepticism during the 1989 European Parliament election. The ED, before the election the third largest group, suffered heavy losses and fell to become the fifth largest group. After the election, the Spanish Popular Alliance left the ED to join the European People's Party Group (EPP), a more pro-European and Christian democratic group than the ED. Prout applied for the Conservative Party to join the EPP but suffered rejection, leaving the Conservatives in the now largely isolated ED group.

Prout received a knighthood in the 1990 New Year Honours.

By now, Prout was accused by some Conservatives in the UK of having "gone native". The Chairman of the Conservative Party Kenneth Baker attempted to improve relations in 1990 by arranging a series of meetings between the group and Thatcher. Despite this, by November 1990 when Thatcher's position was under serious threat, Prout informed the 1922 Committee that 20 of his group wanted her to leave, whilst just five wanted her to remain as Conservative leader. She was later replaced by John Major.

Major's election prompted a thaw in Britain's relations with Europe. Prout supported Major's negotiation of the Maastricht Treaty while the Prime Minister supported Prout's efforts to gain entry into the EPP group. Finally, in April 1992, the EPP voted to accept the Conservatives as "allied members" of their grouping, though not the corresponding European political party, with Prout becoming a vice-chairman of the EPP group. However, following the events of Black Wednesday the Conservative Party became increasingly split over the issue of Europe with Norman Tebbit describing Prout's supporters as "mad keen federalists" and some MEPs attempted to remove Prout as their delegation leader. He survived until the 1994 European Parliament election but lost the supposedly safe seat Herefordshire and Shropshire by nearly 2,000 votes.

== House of Lords ==
Following his election defeat, Prout received a life peerage as Baron Kingsland, of Shrewsbury in the County of Shropshire on 7 October 1994. He reputedly took this title to avoid being nicknamed "Lord Brussels Prout". He was also made a Privy Councillor. He made his maiden speech on the subject of EU fraud and was a chairman of one of the Lords subcommittees on EU affairs. He also received several court appointments: became an assistant recorder for the Wales and Chester circuit, a recorder in 2000 and deputy High court judge in 2005.

In 1997, the new Conservative Party leader William Hague appointed Prout as the Shadow Lord Chancellor to Lord Irvine of Lairg, one of Tony Blair's closest intimates. Prout generally acquitted himself well against Irvine, warning of the risks from adopting the Human Rights Act 1998 and calling for Irvine's resignation in 2001 after it emerged Irvine had invited solicitors and barristers to a Labour Party fundraiser. Following the September 11, 2001 attacks, Prout was a key opponent to government legislation to make it easier to extradite Britons to the United States, though he ultimately gave up after the government introduced it for a third time. He successfully defeated Labour moves to end the right to trial by jury in certain cases, considered to be his greatest achievement by his colleagues.

Prout was also involved in debates surrounding constitutional reform, particularly around the office he was shadowing, the Lord Chancellor. After Irvine's retirement in 2003 the Lord Chancellor's traditional duties were split three ways as part of the concept of separation of powers. The government had intended to abolish the post of Lord Chancellor completely but, partly due to pressure from Prout, the title survived. Nevertheless, the post became diminished and from 2007 the holder (Jack Straw) sat in the House of Commons. In 2008, Prout was moved to the more limited role of Shadow Legal Affairs Minister though, as of 2009, he still led for the Opposition on some debates despite suffering from illness.

Described as being "amiable but dry" and a "skinny, bald brainbox", in the Lords Prout became highly rated for his views and opinions on constitutional and planning issues. A vice-president of JUSTICE, a legal and human rights organisation, he contributed to three volumes of Halsbury's Laws of England. From 2004 until his death he was chairman of the Jersey Competition Regulatory Authority. He was also Deputy lieutenant for Shropshire from 1997 until his death.

He died on 12 July 2009, aged 67, from a pulmonary embolism. He was survived by his wife Carolyn and three stepchildren.

== Arms ==
Coat of arms of Christopher Prout, Baron Kingsland
Crest Rising from a grassy mound Proper a demi-horse Sable gorged with a wreath Argent and Sable with four tails two Argent two Sable supporting with the forelegs a lance Argent flying therefrom a forked pennon per fess Gules and Argent. Escutcheon Paly of six Gules and Vert an eagle displayed Or charged on the breast with a leopard's face Gules. Supporters Dexter, a sea-horse per fess Argent and Vert gorged with a mural crown Vert pendent therefrom a gunstone charged with an acorn slipped and leaved all within a bordure Or. Sinister, a sea-lion per fess Gules and Vert gorged with a naval crown Or pendent therefrom a like gunstone charged with an acorn slipped and leaved all within a bordure Or. Compartment A grassy mount Vert growing therefrom penny royal plants flowered and leaved all Proper. Motto Patria Rex Meus

European Parliament
New constituency	Member of the European Parliament for Salop and Stafford; 1979–1984	Constituency abolished
New constituency	Member of the European Parliament for Shropshire and Stafford; 1984–1994	Constituency abolished
Party political offices
Preceded by Henry Plumb	Chair of the European Democrats; 1987–1992	Position abolished
Preceded by Henry Plumb	Leader of the Conservatives in the European Parliament; 1987–1994	Succeeded by Tom Spencer
Political offices
Preceded by The Lord Mackay of Clashfern	Shadow Lord Chancellor; 1997–2009	Vacant Title next held by Jack Straw
