= Walter Eustace Rhodes =

English historian, translator, librarian and soldier

Walter Rhodes
- Born: Walter Eustace Rhodes; 1872
- Died: 13 July 1918 (aged 46)
- Cause of death: Killed in action
- Occupation: Historian
- Military career
- Allegiance: United Kingdom
- Branch: British Army
- Rank: Private
- Service number: 79174
- Unit: Devonshire Regiment
- Conflicts: First World War †

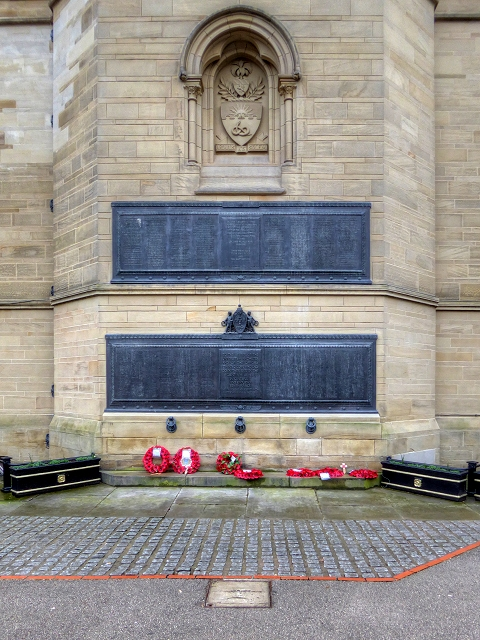
War memorial, Old Quadrangle, University of Manchester

Walter Eustace Rhodes (1872 – 13 July 1918) was an English historian, translator, librarian and soldier.

Rhodes was the son of John and Ellen Rhodes, of Cheetham, Manchester. From 1895 until his resignation in 1903 he was the librarian of Owens College Library.

During the First World War he served as a private in the Devonshire Regiment. He was killed on 13 July 1918 and is memorialised on the war memorial of the University of Manchester.

== Works ==
Rhodes made several contributions to the Dictionary of National Biography. He also had material published by the Chetham Society

- The Apostolical Life of Ambrose Barlow, (ed.) (1909) Manchester: Chetham Society
- Chetham miscellanies, (1909) Manchester: Chetham Society

Also:

- "The Italian bankers in England and their loans to Edward I and Edward II" in Historical essays by members of the Owens college, Manchester (1901) p. 137-168
