= David Collison =

British chemist

- Born: David Collison
- Education: University of Manchester (Bsc., PhD)
- Known for: Coordination Chemistry; Electron paramagnetic resonance spectroscopy Lanthanide Chemistry; Actinide Chemistry
- Awards: Bruker Prize (2020)
- Scientific career
- Fields: Inorganic chemistry Magnetochemistry
- Workplaces: The University of Manchester
- Thesis: Electronic structures of some d^{1} and d^{2} oxo- and nitrido- d transition metal complexes (1979)
- Doctoral advisor: Prof. David Garner; Prof. Ian Hillier

David Collison is a British chemist and a Professor in the Department of Chemistry at The University of Manchester. His research in general is based on inorganic chemistry and magnetochemistry, specifically on coordination chemistry, electron paramagnetic resonance spectroscopy and f-block chemistry.

== Education ==
Collison completed both his Bachelor of Science degree and Doctor of Philosophy degree at University of Manchester and successfully completed them in 1976 and 1980 respectively. His PhD thesis on Electronic structures of some d^{1} and d^{2} oxo- and nitrido- d transition metal complexes was supervised by David Garner and Ian Hillier.

== Research and career ==
Upon completing his PhD, Collison joined the University of Manchester Institute of Science and Technology (now University of Manchester) as a Research Associate from 1979 to 1982. He then was a Research Assistant from 1982 to 1983, Science and Engineering Research Council Postdoctoral Fellow from 1983 to 1984, and a Royal Society University Research Fellow from 1984 - 1994. By this time, he also joined the University of Manchester as a Senior Lecturer, and was promoted to the position of Reader in 1998 and to the position of Professor and Chair of Inorganic Chemistry in 2007.

Collison's research in general is based on inorganic chemistry and magnetochemistry, specifically on coordination chemistry, electron paramagnetic resonance spectroscopy and f-block chemistry.

Apart from research and lecturing, Collison is also the Co-Founder and Director of the Engineering and Physical Sciences Research Council National Electron Paramagnetic Spectroscopy Facility. He was also the former Chair of the Electron Spin Resonance Spectroscopy Group of the Royal Society of Chemistry and is part of the Molecular Magnetism Group at University of Manchester along with Nicholas F. Chilton, Richard Winpenny, Eric McInnes, Grigore Timco and Floriana Tuna.

=== Notable work ===
Collison is one of the leading researchers in electron paramagnetic resonance spectroscopy. For his significant contributions to the experimental and theoretical fundamentals of transition metal electron paramagnetic resonance, from bioinorganic chemistry to molecular materials, and for his contribution to the book Electron Paramagnetic Resonance (Volume 19), he received the Bruker Prize in 2020, which is one of the world's highest awards in electron paramagnetic resonance.

In 2016, Collison participated in a research which reported the use of an organic donor–acceptor polymer containing a viologen electron acceptor and triarylamine electron donor as a platform in the development of multifunctional materials. The research explored the interplay between electronic and host–guest interactions in the synthesized polymers; POP-V1 containing a redox active triarylamine core and POP-V2 containing a redox inactive benzene core, in which the redox states present can be reversibly accessed. The research showed that the degree of charge transfer in addition to the H_{2} and CO_{2} gas adsorption properties of the polymer are able to be tuned as a function of the electronic state which has important implications for the potential applications of these polymers in optical, electrochromic and solar cell devices.

In 2015, Collison participated in a research which reported a dysprosium^{(III)} bis(methanediide) single molecule magnet (SMM) with two large thermally activated energy barriers (U_{eff}) of 721 K and 813 K. This was the largest U_{eff} ever reported for a monometallic dysprosium^{(III)} complex. The work was able to validate a design strategy towards realising high-temperature SMMs and also provide an insight to the unusual spin relaxation behaviour shown by the SMM.

=== Awards and nominations ===
- Bruker Prize (2020)

== Major publications ==
- Collison, David; Chilton, Nicholas F.; Giansiracusa, Marcus J.; Moreno-Pineda, Eufemio; Tuna, Floriana; Hussain, Riaz; Marx, Raphael; Prada, María Martínez; McInnes, Eric J.L.; Winpenny, Richard E.P.; Liddle, Stephen T.; Neugebauer, Petr; Al-Badran, Susan; Slageren, Joris van; Carretta, Stefano; Guidi, Tatiana (2018). "Measurement of Magnetic Exchange in Asymmetric Lanthanide Dimetallics: Toward a Transferable Theoretical Framework". J. Am. Chem. Soc. 140 (7): 2504–2513. doi:10.1021/jacs.7b10714. PMID 29373020.
- Collison, David; Chan, Bun; Rawal, Aditya; Hua, Carol; Tuna, Floriana; Hook, James M.; D'Alessandro, Deanna M. (2016). "Redox tunable viologen-based porous organic polymers". Journal of Materials Chemistry C. 4 (13): 2535–2544. doi:10.1039/C6TC00132G. hdl:10536/DRO/DU:30157792.
- Collison, David; Chilton, Nicholas F.; Gregson, Matthew; Ariciu, Ana-Maria; Tuna, Floriana; Crowe, Iain F.; Lewis, William; Blake, Alexander J.; McInnes, Eric J.L.; Winpenny, Richard E.P.; Liddle, Stephen T. (2016). "A monometallic lanthanide bis(methanediide) single molecule magnet with a large energy barrier and complex spin relaxation behaviour". Chemical Science. 7 (1): 155–165. doi:10.1039/C5SC03111G. PMC 5950554. PMID 29861976.
- Collison, David; Nguyen, ThaoNguyen; Håkansson, Pär; Edge, Ruth; Goodman, Bernard A.; Burns, Jonathan R.; Stulz, Eugen (2014). "EPR based distance measurement in Cu-porphyrin–DNA". New Journal of Chemistry. 38 (11): 5254–5259. doi:10.1039/C4NJ00673A.
- Collison, David; McInnes, Eric (2004). "EPR of exchange-coupled oligomers". In Gilbert, Bruce C.; Davies, M.J.; Murphy, Damien M. (eds.). Electron Paramagnetic Resonance. Vol. 19. Springer-Verlag, Germany. pp. 374–398. doi:10.1039/9781847553560-00374. ISBN 978-0-85404-320-0.
