= Floriana Tuna =

Romanian chemist

- Education: University of Bucharest (Bsc., MSc.); Institute of Physical Chemistry of the Romanian Academy (PhD)
- Known for: Molecular magnetism EPR spectroscopy Quantum computing
- Awards: Romanian Academy 'Ilie Murgulescu' Award (2005)
- Scientific career
- Fields: Inorganic chemistry Magnetochemistry
- Workplaces: The University of Manchester
- Doctoral advisors: Luminița Patron; Marius Andruh

Floriana Tuna is a Romanian and British chemist and a professor in the Department of Chemistry at The University of Manchester. Her research in general is based on inorganic chemistry, magnetochemistry, and EPR spectroscopy, and their applications to environmental, energy and quantum computing science.

== Education ==
Floriana completed her Bachelor of Science at University of Bucharest. She continued to read her Master of Science degree at University of Bucharest and successfully completed it in 1989 before moving to 'Ilie Murgulescu' Institute of Physical Chemistry of the Romanian Academy to read her Doctor of Philosophy degree in transition metal chemistry, which was completed in 1997 and was supervised by Marius Andruh and Luminița Patron.

== Research and career ==
Upon graduation, Floriana completed her postdoctoral research in Molecular Magnetism with Jean-Pascal Sutter at Institut de Chimie de la Matière Condensée de Bordeaux (ICMCB), France and also as a visiting Deutscher Akademischer Austauschdienst (DAAD) Fellow at University of Heidelberg, Germany. She then received a Marie Curie Individual Fellowship at University of Warwick to work in supramolecular chemistry before moving to University of Manchester in 2003 as a Researcher. She was later promoted to the position of Senior Researcher and then Reader of Inorganic Chemistry and EPR. She is part of the Molecular Magnetism group at University of Manchester, together with David Collison, Nicholas F. Chilton, Grigore Timco, Eric McInnes and Richard Winpenny.

Floriana's research in general is based on inorganic chemistry and magnetochemistry, specifically on molecular magnetism, EPR spectroscopy and quantum computing.

=== Notable work ===
In 2019, Floriana participated in a research which reported the capability of a MFI-type zeolite (NbAlS-1) could be used to convert aqueous solutions of γ-valerolactone (GVL) (obtained from biomass-derived carbohydrates) into butenes with a yield of more than 99% at ambient pressure under continuous flow conditions. The conversion of the renewable biomass into butenes offered the prospect for the sustainable production of butene as a platform chemical for the manufacture of renewable materials.

In 2019, she participated in a research which showed the capability to use a porous metal–organic framework (MOF) to provide a selective, fully reversible and repeatable capability to capture nitrogen dioxide (NO_{2}), a toxic air pollutant produced particularly by diesel and bio-fuel use. The NO_{2} can then be easily converted into nitric acid, an industry with a wide range of uses including, agricultural fertilizer for crops; rocket propellant and nylon.

In 2016, Floriana confirmed the capability to use pulsed EPR spectroscopy to measure the covalency of actinide complexes in a research in collaboration with Eric McInnes and David P. Mills at the University of Manchester. Prior to this research, the extent of covalency in actinide complexes was less understood as this nature of bonding was not studied due to limited technology and methods of experimentation at the time. The use of pulsed EPR spectroscopy was able to determine the covalency of thorium^{III} and Uranium^{III} complexes for the first time and this paved the way to further research on the use of these complexes in the separation and recycling of nuclear waste.

=== Awards and nominations ===
- Royal Society of Chemistry Dalton Horizon Prize (2024)
- Royal Society of Chemistry Dalton Horizon Prize (2021)
- Leverhulme Trust Research Fellowship (2018)
- Romanian Academy 'Ilie Murgulescu' Prize (2005)

== Major publications ==
- Tuna, Floriana; Blagg, Robin J.; Muryn, Christopher A.; McInnes, Eric J. L.; Winpenny, Richard (2011). "Single Pyramid Magnets: Dy_{5} Pyramids with Slow Magnetic Relaxation to 40 K". Angewandte Chemie International Edition. 50 (29): 6530–6533. Bibcode:2011ACIE...50.6530B. doi:10.1002/anie.201101932. PMID 21656622.
- Tuna, Floriana; Timco, Grigore A.; Carretta, Stefano; Troiani, Filippo; Pritchard, Robin J.; Muryn, Christopher A; McInnes, Eric J.L.; Ghirri, Alberto; Candini, Andrea; Santini, Paolo; Amoretti, Giuseppe; Affronte, Marco; Winpenny, Richard E.P. (2009). "Engineering the coupling between molecular spin qubits by coordination chemistry". Nature Nanotechnology. 4 (3): 173–178. Bibcode:2009NatNa...4..173T. doi:10.1038/nnano.2008.404. hdl:11380/598326. PMID 19265847.
- Tuna, Floriana; Gregson, Matthew; Chilton, Nicholas F.; Ariciu, Ana-Maria; McInnes, Eric J.L.; Collison, David; Crowe, Iain F.; Lewis, William; Winpenny, Richard E.P.; Blake, Alexander J.; Liddle, Stephen T. (2015). "A monometallic lanthanide bis(methanediide) single molecule magnet with a large energy barrier and complex spin relaxation behaviour". Chemical Science. 7 (1): 155–165. doi:10.1039/C5SC03111G. PMC 5950554. PMID 29861976.
- Tuna, Floriana; Zheng, Yan-Zhen; Evangelisti, Marco; Winpenny, Richard (2012). "Co–Ln Mixed-Metal Phosphonate Grids and Cages as Molecular Magnetic Refrigerants". Journal of the American Chemical Society. 134 (2): 1057–1065. Bibcode:2012JAChS.134.1057Z. doi:10.1021/ja208367k. PMID 22171923.
- Tuna, Floriana; Blagg, Robin J.; Ungur, Liviu; Speak, James; McInnes, Eric J. L.; Collison, David; Wernsdorfer, Wolfgang; Chibotaru, Liviu F.; Winpenny, Richard E.P. (2013). "Magnetic relaxation pathways in lanthanide single-molecule magnets". Nature Chemistry. 5 (8): 673–678. Bibcode:2013NatCh...5..673B. doi:10.1038/nchem.1707. PMID 23881498.
