= Eric McInnes =

British chemist

Eric McInnes FRSE
- Born: Eric John Logan McInnes; 1970 or 1971 (age 55–56); Cheapside, London
- Education: University of Edinburgh (BSc, PhD)
- Known for: Molecular Magnetism; EPR spectroscopy Coordination Chemistry
- Awards: Tilden Prize (2019)
- Scientific career
- Fields: Inorganic chemistry Magnetochemistry
- Workplaces: University of Manchester
- Thesis: Physico-chemical studies of co-ordination complexes of the platinum group metals (1995)
- Doctoral advisor: Lesley Yellowlees
- Doctoral students: Nicholas F. Chilton

Eric John Logan McInnes FRSE is a British chemist and a professor in the Department of Chemistry at The University of Manchester. His research in general is based on inorganic chemistry and magnetochemistry, specifically on molecular magnetism, EPR spectroscopy and coordination chemistry.

== Education ==
McInnes completed his Bachelor of Science and Doctor of Philosophy degree at University of Edinburgh in 1992 and 1995 respectively. His PhD on Physico-chemical studies of co-ordination complexes of the platinum group metals was supervised by Lesley Yellowlees.

== Research and career ==
After graduating, McInnes completed his postdoctoral research with David Collison and F.E. Mabbs at University of Manchester from 1995 - 1998 before moving to University of East Anglia to take up a postdoctoral research with A.K. Powell and A.J. Thomson in 1999. He then moved back to University of Manchester as a Lecturer and was promoted to Chair of inorganic chemistry in 2007.

McInnes's research in general is based on inorganic chemistry and magnetochemistry, specifically on molecular magnetism, EPR spectroscopy and coordination chemistry.

Apart from research and lecturing, McInnes was also the chair in the 50th, 51st and 52nd international meeting of the Royal Society of Chemistry ESR group. He also was a discussant in the Keynote lecture's held at the Asian Pacific EPR Symposium and International Conference on Coordination Chemistry which was held in 2018. McInnes also holds an author profile in Angewandte Chemie. He is also part of the Molecular Magnetism Group at University of Manchester along with Nicholas F. Chilton, Richard Winpenny, David Collison, Grigore Timco and Floriana Tuna.

=== Notable work ===
In 2016, McInnes confirmed the capability to use pulsed EPR spectroscopy to measure the covalency of actinide complexes in a research in collaboration with Floriana Tuna and David P. Mills at the University of Manchester. Prior to this research, the extent of covalency in actinide complexes was less understood as this nature of bonding was not studied due to limited technology and methods of experimentation at the time. The use of pulsed EPR spectroscopy was able to determine the covalency of thorium^{(III)} and Uranium^{(III)} complexes for the first time and this paved the way to further research on the use of these complexes in the separation and recycling of nuclear waste.

=== Awards and nominations ===
- Tilden Prize (2019)
- Elected a Fellow of the Royal Society of Edinburgh (FRSE) in 2019
- International EPR Society Medal for Chemistry (2015)

=== Major publications ===
- McInnes, Eric J. L.; Formanuik, Alasdair; Ariciu, Ana-Maria; Ortu, Fabrizio; Beekmeyer, Reece; Kerridge, Andrew; Tuna, Floriana; McInnes1, Eric J. L.; Mills, David P. (2017). "Actinide covalency measured by pulsed electro paramagnetic resonance spectroscopy" (PDF). Nature Chemistry. 9 (47): 578–583. Bibcode:2017NatCh...9..578F. doi:10.1038/nchem.2692. PMID 28537586.
- McInnes, Eric J. L.; Gregson, Matthew; Lu, Erli; Hennig, Christoph; Tuna, Floriana; Scheinost, Andreas C.; McMaster, Jonathan; Lewis, William; Kerridge, Andrew; Blake, Alexander J.; Liddle, Stephen T. (2016). "Emergence of comparable covalency in isostructural cerium^{(iv)}– and uranium^{(iv)}–carbon multiple bonds". Chemical Science. 7 (5): 155–165. doi:10.1039/C6SC00278A. PMC 6006499. PMID 29997821.
- McInnes, Eric J. L.; Gregson, Matthew; Chilton, Nicholas F.; Ariciu, Ana-Maria; Tuna, Floriana; Collison, David; Crowe, Iain F.; Lewis, William; Winpenny, Richard E.P.; Blake, Alexander J.; Liddle, Stephen T. (2015). "A monometallic lanthanide bis(methanediide) single molecule magnet with a large energy barrier and complex spin relaxation behaviour". Chemical Science. 7 (1): 155–165. doi:10.1039/C5SC03111G. PMC 5950554. PMID 29861976.
- McInnes, Eric J. L.; Gardner, Benedict M.; Balázs, Gábor; Scheer, Manfred; Tuna, Floriana; McMaster, Jonathan; Lewis, William; Blake, Alexander J.; Liddle, Stephen T. (2015). "Triamidoamine uranium^{(IV)}–arsenic complexes containing one-, two- and threefold U–As bonding interactions". Nature Chemistry. 7 (7): 582–590. doi:10.1038/nchem.2279. PMID 26100807. S2CID 9697479.
- McInnes, Eric J. L.; Blagg, Robin J.; Ungur, Liviu; Speak, James; Comar, Priyanka; Tuna, Floriana; Collison, David; Wernsdorfer, Wolfgang; Chibotaru, Liviu F.; Winpenny, Richard E.P. (2013). "Magnetic relaxation pathways in lanthanide single-molecule magnets". Nature Chemistry. 5 (8): 673–678. Bibcode:2013NatCh...5..673B. doi:10.1038/nchem.1707. PMID 23881498.
