= Roberta Sessoli =

Italian chemist

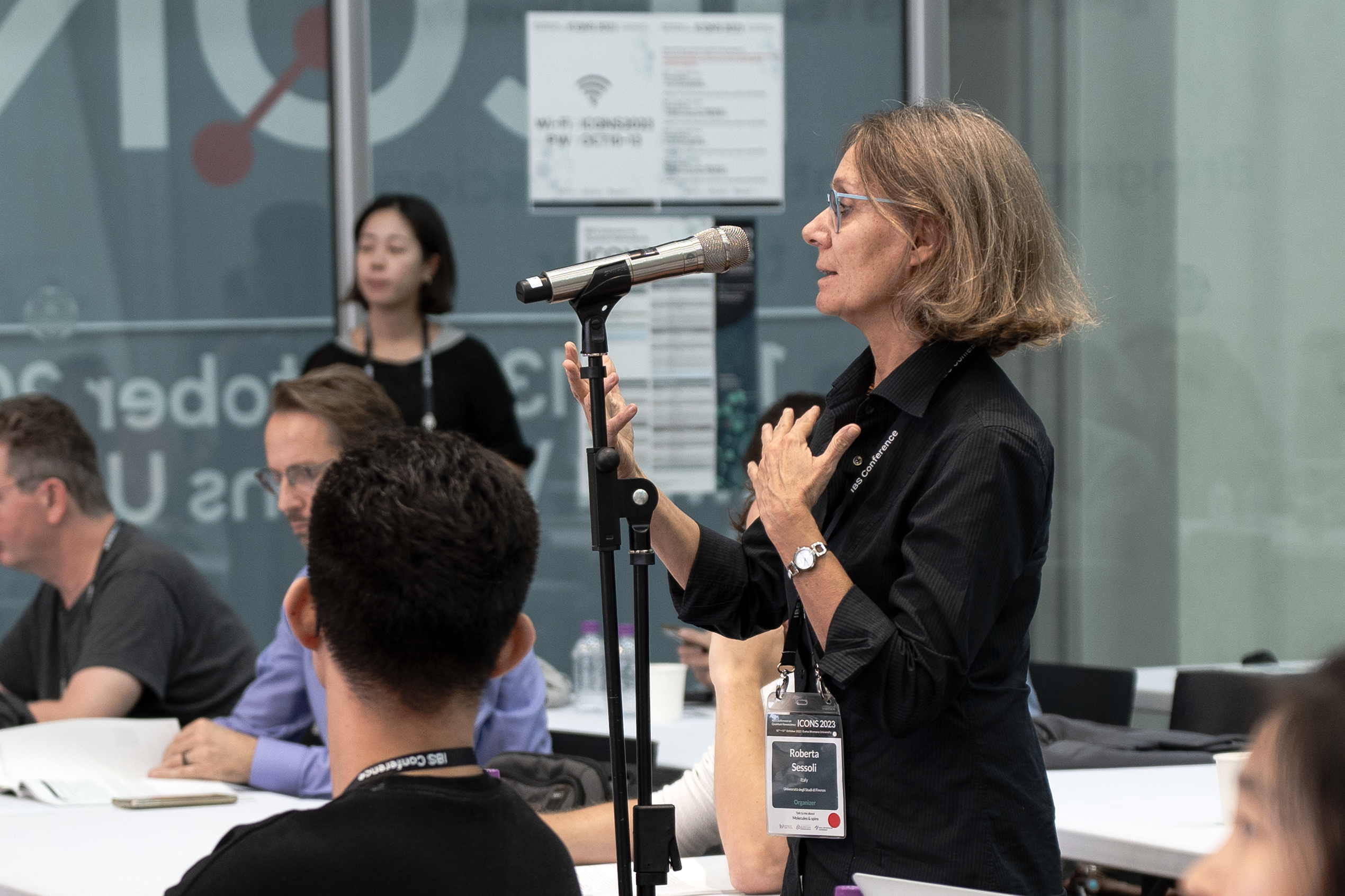
- Roberta Sessoli asking a question at the IBS Conference on Quantum Nanoscience 2023.
- Born: 23 June 1963 (age 62); Florence
- Education: University of Florence (BS) University of Florence (PhD)
- Occupations: Professor of General and Inorganic Chemistry
- Employer: University of Florence

Roberta Sessoli is Professor of General and Inorganic Chemistry in the Department of Chemistry "Ugo Schiff" at the University of Florence. Renowned as a pioneer in the field of magnetic bistability and quantum effects in mesoscopic materials, her research centers around investigating the magnetic properties of molecular clusters and chains, with a focus on designing and characterizing molecular magnetic materials.

== Education and early career ==
Roberta Sessoli was born in Florence on the 23 June 1963. She attended Liceo Scientifico Guido Castelnuovo in Florence. She graduated in Chemistry from the University of Florence in 1987. In 1992, she obtained her PhD from the same university, under the supervision of Professor Dante Gatteschi. She conducted a part of her studies at the Institut d’Electronique Fondamentale – Université Paris-Sud, France. Her PhD thesis was on "Molecular Magnetic Materials" (original title in Italian: "Materiali Magnetici Molecolari").

== Research interests ==
Sessoli began working at the University of Florence in 2000, and became full Professor of General and Inorganic Chemistry in the Department of Chemistry "Ugo Schiff" at the University of Florence in 2012. She has been an invited professor at Pierre & Marie Curie University, Paris, in 2001, and at Otago University, New Zealand, in 2017. From 2018 to 2019, she was awarded a visiting professorship at Gutenberg University in Mainz, Germany.

Sessoli is interested in molecular and low-dimensional magnetism. She also worked on the spin dynamics of nanostructured materials. She investigated the nature of single molecules magnets. Part of her research also focusses on quantistic technologies and spintronic molecular materials. More recently, her studies concentrated on the characterization of magnetic materials through the use of unpolarised light. She uses a range of characterization techniques such as magnetometry, electron paramagnetic resonance, X-ray diffraction, and X-ray absorption.

== Publications ==
Sessoli's most influential publication is "Magnetic bistability in a metal-ion cluster", published in Nature in 1993 only one year after the completion of her PhD. This was a particularly influential article in the field of molecular magnetism, and was co-authored with Dante Gatteschi, Andrea Caneschi and Miguel A. Novak. Since then the article has received more than 2770 citations. In 2018, Sessoli was nominated as one of the most highly cited researchers by Clarivate Analytics.

Sessoli co-authored the book "Molecular Nanomagnets" with Dante Gatteschi and Jacques Villain, which was published by Oxford University Press in 2006.

== Awards ==
For her work in chemistry, Sessoli received a wide range of awards:

- 2000 Medaglia Nasini for best young inorganic chemist in Italy
- 2002 Gonfalone d’argento from the Regional Council of Tuscany
- 2002 Agilent Technologies Europhysics Prize
- 2012 Beller lectureship of the American Physical Society
- 2013 French-Italian Prize from Société Chimique de France
- 2013 Linceo Prize for Chemistry from Accademia Nazionale dei Lincei
- 2015 Lecoq de Boisbaudran Award from the European Rare Earths Society
- 2015 Fiorino d’oro from Florence City Council
- 2015 IUPAC Distinguished Women in Chemistry award
- 2017 Visiting Professorship at the Otago University, New Zealand
- 2018-2019 Visiting Professorship at the Johannes Gutenberg University Mainz
- 2019 RSC Centenary Prize for world-leading research on molecular magnetism
- 2023 Honorary Doctorate from the University of Barcelona

== Family and personal life ==
Sessoli has three sons: Lapo, Corso and Vieri.

The fire station in via La Farina in Florence is named after Sessoli's grandfather, Giuseppe Sessoli, who was a fireman during the Second World War and died trying to save a woman and a little girl who were on a mined bridge.
