= David P. Mills =

British chemist

David Mills
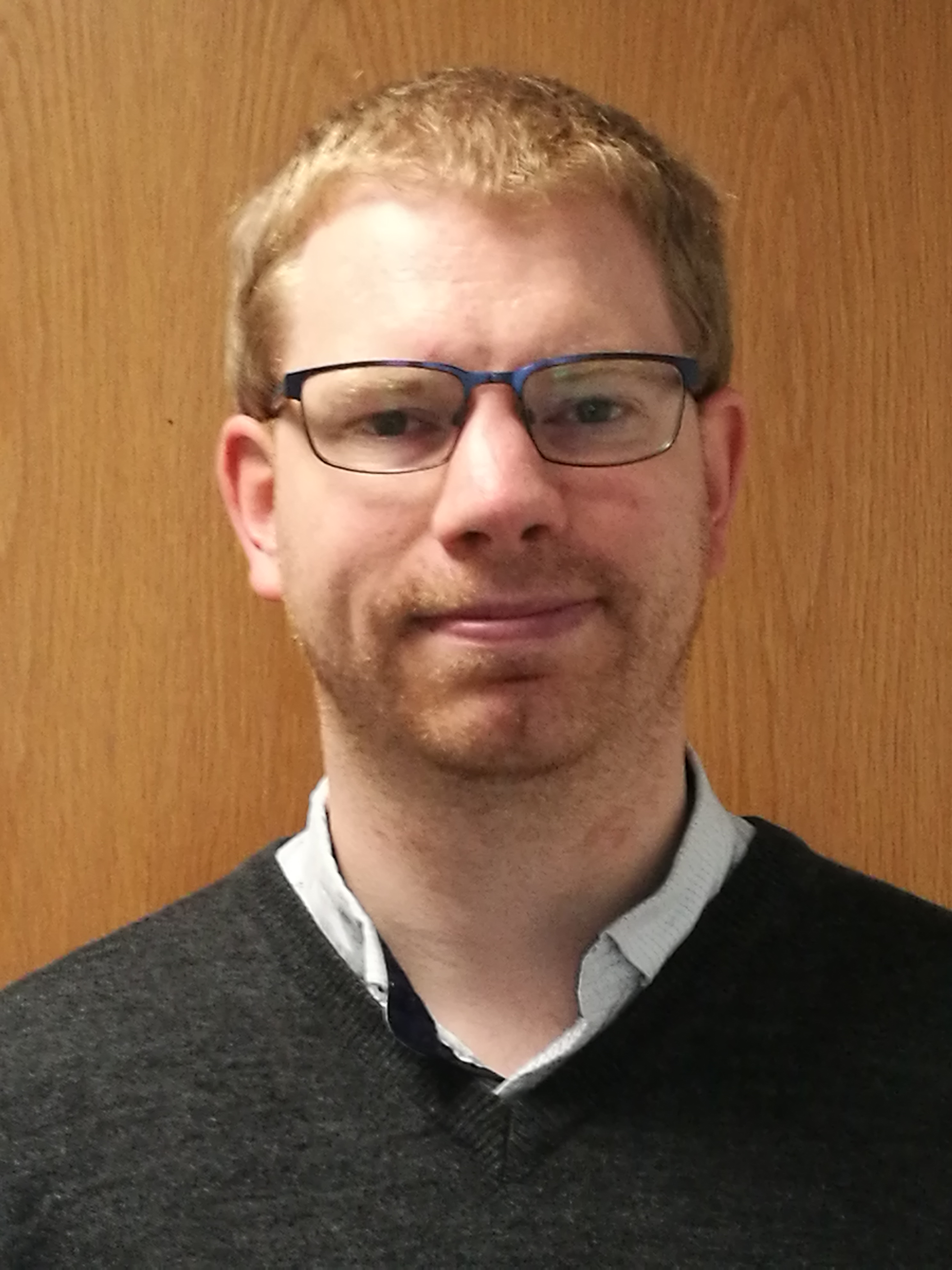
- Prof. David Mills
- Born: David Paul Mills; Wales
- Education: Cardiff University (MChem, PhD)
- Known for: f-element compounds Inorganic Synthesis
- Awards: Excellent Academic Advisor Award (2020); Bill Newton Award (2019); Periodic Table of Younger Chemists (2018); Harrison-Meldola Memorial Prizes (2018)
- Scientific career
- Fields: Inorganic chemistry Lanthanide chemistry Actinide chemistry Organometallic chemistry
- Workplaces: The University of Manchester
- Thesis: Investigations into the Reactivity of an Anionic Gallium(I) N-Heterocyclic Carbene Analogue (2007)
- Doctoral advisor: Prof. Cameron Jones
- Website: millsgroup.weebly.com

David Paul Mills is a British chemist and a professor in the Department of Chemistry at The University of Manchester. His research typically investigates the chemistry of the lanthanide and actinide f-block elements. This is generally based on the synthesis of new f-block complexes, structural and bonding properties and their uses in different fields including in nuclear fuel cycles, energy and single molecule magnets.

== Education ==
Mills completed his MChem in 2004 at Cardiff University where he finished his masters project with Prof. Cameron Jones. Upon graduation, he continued to read for his Doctor of Philosophy degree with Prof. Jones on Investigations into the Reactivity of an Anionic Gallium(I) N-Heterocyclic Carbene Analogue and successfully gained his PhD in 2007.

== Research and career ==
Mills completed his postdoctoral research with Prof. Stephen Liddle at the University of Nottingham before moving to the University of Manchester in 2012 as a Lecturer. In 2017, he was promoted to the Senior Lecturer position and in 2019 was promoted to Reader in the Department of Chemistry at the University of Manchester. He was promoted to the position of professor in June 2021.

Mill's research is generally on lanthanide and actinide chemistry and is specifically based on the synthesis of new f-block complexes, structural and bonding properties and their uses in different fields including in nuclear fuel cycles, energy and single molecule magnets.

Apart from research and lecturing, Mills has also worked at the Royal Society of Chemistry, Manchester as the District Local Section Science Secretary and the University of Manchester Royal Society of Chemistry representative from (2013–2017), the Nuclear Materials Control Officer for the Centre for Radiochemical Research (2014–2019) and also as the co-organiser of Royal Society of Chemistry Manchester Dalton Northern (2015), Dial-a-Molecule Conference (2015) and Royal Society of Chemistry Manchester Northwest Organic and Dalton Division Awards Symposium (2013).

=== Notable work ===
In 2017, Mills and Nicholas F. Chilton led a research on the magnetic hysteresis at 60 kelvin in dysprosocenium. This was the first time a higher temperature magnetic hysteresis has been observed, with the previously record being 30 K. The research introduced the ability to use liquid nitrogen instead of more expensive liquid helium during the magnetic hysteresis phenomenon which led to the attention of data storage server companies as the research introduced the potential of reducing both costs and energy requirements of data servers.

In 2016, Mills also confirmed the capability to use pulsed EPR spectroscopy to measure the covalency of actinide complexes in research in collaboration with Floriana Tuna and Professor Eric Mcinnes at the University of Manchester. Prior to this research, the extent of covalency in actinide complexes was less understood as this nature of bonding was not studied due to limited technology and methods of experimentation at the time. The use of pulsed EPR spectroscopy was able to determine the covalency of thorium^{(III)} and Uranium^{(III)} complexes for the first time and this paved the way to further research on the use of these complexes in the separation and recycling of nuclear waste.

=== Awards and nominations ===
- Excellent Academic Advisor Award (2020)
- Bill Newton Award (2019)
- Periodic Table of Younger Chemists (2018)
- Harrison-Meldola Memorial Prize (2018)

== Major Reviews and Publications ==
The following research and review papers by David Mills has been classified as "hot papers" from the journals in which the paper is published.

1. Reviews

- Ortu, Fabrizio; Formanuik, Alasdair; Innes, James R.; Mills, David .P (2017). "New vistas in the molecular chemistry of thorium: low oxidation state complexes". Dalton Transactions. 45 (18): 439–442. doi:10.1039/C6DT01111J. PMID 27094204.

2. Research Publications

- Goodwin, Conrad A. P.; Ortu, Fabrizio; Reta, Daniel; Chilton, Nicholas F.; Mills, David .P. (2017). "Molecular magnetic hysteresis at 60 K in dyspropsocenium". Nature. 548 (7668): 439–442. doi:10.1038/nature23447. PMID 28836589. S2CID 4454501.
- Liu, Jingjing; Ortu, Fabrizio; Reta, Daniel; Cleghorn, Jake A.; Yeoh, Yu Xuan; Goodwin, Conrad A.P.; Chilton, Nicholas F.; Mills, David .P. (2019). "Light Lanthanide Metallocenium Cations Exhibiting WeakEquatorial Anion Interactions". Chem. Eur. J. 25 (32): 7749–7758. doi:10.1002/chem.201901167. PMC 6637382. PMID 30994214.
- Gregson, Matthew P.; Ortu, Fabrizio; Reta, Daniel; Ding, You-Song; McInnes, Eric M.J.; Winpenny, Richard E.P.; Zheng, Yan-Zhen; Liddle, Stephen T.; Goodwin, Conrad A.P.; Chilton, Nicholas F.; Mills, David .P. (2019). "Studies of hysteresis and quantum tunnelling of the magnetisation in dysprosium(iii) single molecule magnets". Dalton Trans. 48 (24): 8541–8545. doi:10.1039/C9DT01655D. PMID 31112169. S2CID 160012501.
- Nicholas, Hannah M.; Vonci, Michele; Loo, Song Wei; Murphy, Siobhan R.; McInnes, Eric M.J.; Winpenny, Richard E.P.; Cassim, Daniel; Goodwin, Conrad A.P.; Chilton, Nicholas F.; Mills, David .P. (2019). "Electronic structures of bent lanthanide(III) complexes with two N-donor ligands". Chemical Science. 10 (45): 10493–10502. doi:10.1039/C9SC03431E. PMC 7020784. PMID 32110338.
- Parmar, Vijay; Ma, Xiaozhou; Winpenny, Richard E.P.; Clerac, Rodolphe; Chilton, Nicholas F.; Mills, David .P (2020). "Probing relaxation dynamics in five-coordinate dysprosium single-molecule magnets". Chemistry – A European Journal. 26 (35): 7774–7778. doi:10.1002/chem.202001235. PMC 7383731. PMID 32216105.
