= Quantum spin tunneling =

Physical phenomenon

Quantum spin tunneling, or quantum tunneling of magnetization, is a physical phenomenon by which the quantum mechanical state that describes the collective magnetization of a nanomagnet is a linear superposition of two states with well defined and opposite magnetization. Classically, the magnetic anisotropy favors neither of the two states with opposite magnetization, so that the system has two equivalent ground states.

Because of the quantum spin tunneling, an energy splitting between the bonding and anti-bonding linear combination of states with opposite magnetization classical ground states arises, giving rise to a unique ground state separated by the first excited state by an energy difference known as quantum spin tunneling splitting. The quantum spin tunneling splitting also occurs for pairs of excited states with opposite magnetization.

As a consequence of quantum spin tunneling, the magnetization of a system can switch between states with opposite magnetization that are separated by an energy barrier much larger than thermal energy. Thus, quantum spin tunneling provides a pathway to magnetization switching forbidden in classical physics.

Whereas quantum spin tunneling shares some properties with quantum tunneling in other two level systems such as a single electron in a double quantum well or in a diatomic molecule, it is a multi-electron phenomenon, since more than one electron is required to have magnetic anisotropy. The multi-electron character is also revealed by an important feature, absent in single-electron tunneling: zero field quantum spin tunneling splitting is only possible for integer spins, and is certainly absent for half-integer spins, as ensured by Kramers degeneracy theorem. In real systems containing Kramers ions, like crystalline samples of single ion magnets, the degeneracy of the ground states is frequently lifted through dipolar interactions with neighboring spins, and as such quantum spin tunneling is frequently observed even in the absence of an applied external field for these systems.

Initially discussed in the context of magnetization dynamics of magnetic nanoparticles, the concept was known as macroscopic quantum tunneling, a term that highlights both the difference with single electron tunneling and connects this phenomenon with other macroscopic quantum phenomena. In this sense, the problem of quantum spin tunneling lies in the boundary between the quantum and classical descriptions of reality.

== Single spin Hamiltonian ==
A simple single spin Hamiltonian that describes quantum spin tunneling for a spin $S$ is given by:

$\hat{H}= D\hat{S}_z^2 + E (\hat{S}_x^2 -\hat{S}_y^2)$ [1]

where D and E are parameters that determine the magnetic anisotropy, and $\hat{S}_x, \hat{S}_y, \hat{S}_z$ are spin matrices of dimension $2S+1$ . It is customary to take z as the easy axis so that D<0 and |D|>> E. For E=0, this Hamiltonian commutes with $\hat{S}_z$ , so that we can write the eigenvalues as $E(S_z)= DS_z^2$, where $S_z$ takes the 2S+1 values in the list (S, S-1, ...., -S)

describes a set of doublets, with $E=0$ and $D<0$ . In the case of integer spins the second term of the Hamiltonian results in the splitting of the otherwise degenerate ground state doublet. In this case, the zero field quantum spin tunneling splitting is given by:

$\Delta \propto E \left(\frac{E}{D}\right)^{(S-1)}$

From this result, it is apparent that, given that E/D is much smaller than 1 by construction, the quantum spin tunnelling splitting becomes suppressed in the limit of large spin S, i.e., as we move from the atomic scale towards the macroscopic world. The magnitude of the quantum spin tunnelling splitting can be modulated by application of a magnetic field along the transverse hard axis direction (in the case of Hamiltonian [1], with D<0 and E>0, the x axis). The modulation of the quantum spin tunnelling splitting results in oscillations of its magnitude, including specific values of the transverse field at which the splitting vanishes. This accidental degeneracies are known as diabolic points. At these diabolic points where quantum spin tunneling is quenched, lifetimes may increase by several orders of magnitude, clearly showing the lack of tunneling.

== Observation ==
Quantum tunneling of the magnetization was reported in 1996 for a crystal of Mn_{12}ac molecules with S=10. Quoting Thomas and coworkers, "in an applied magnetic field, the magnetization shows hysteresis loops with a distinct 'staircase' structure: the steps occur at values of the applied field where the energies of different collective spin states of the manganese clusters coincide. At these special values of the field, relaxation from one spin state to another is enhanced above the thermally activated rate by the action of resonant quantum-mechanical tunneling". Quantum tunneling of the magnetization was reported in ferritin present in horse spleen proteins

A direct measurement of the quantum spin tunneling splitting energy can be achieved using single spin scanning tunneling inelastic spectroscopy, that permits to measure the spin excitations of individual atoms on surfaces. Using this technique, the spin excitation spectrum of an individual integer spin was obtained by Hirjibehedin et al. for a S=2 single Fe atom on a surface of Cu_{2}N/Cu(100), that made it possible to measure a quantum spin tunneling splitting of 0.2 meV. Using the same technique other groups measured the spin excitations of S=1 Fe phthalocyanine molecule on a copper surface and a S=1 Fe atom on InSb, both of which had a quantum spin tunneling splitting of the $S_z=\pm1$ doublet larger than 1 meV.

In the case of molecular magnets with large S and small E/D ratio, indirect measurement techniques are required to infer the value of the quantum spin tunneling splitting. For instance, modeling time dependent magnetization measurements of a crystal of Fe_{8} molecular magnets with the Landau-Zener formula, Wernsdorfer and Sessoli inferred tunneling splittings in the range of 10^{−7} Kelvin.
