= Richard Winpenny =

British chemist

- Born: Richard Eric Parry Winpenny; Port Talbot, Wales, UK
- Education: Sandfields Comprehensive School, Port Talbot
- Alma mater: Imperial College London (Bsc., PhD)
- Known for: Single-molecule magnetism Inorganic synthesis Supramolecular chemistry Polymetallic caged complexes
- Awards: RSC Prize for Emerging Technologies in the area of materials (2016); Ludwig Mond Award (2016); Fellow of the Learned Society of Wales (2016); Tilden Prize (2011); Royal Society Wolfson Merit Award (2009); 2021 Dalton Division Horizon Prize
- Scientific career
- Fields: Inorganic chemistry Magnetochemistry
- Workplaces: The University of Manchester
- Thesis: New heterometallic polynuclear complexes (1988)
- Doctoral advisor: David Goodgame
- Doctoral students: Nicholas F. Chilton

Richard Eric Parry Winpenny FRSC FLSW is a British chemist and a professor in the Department of Chemistry at the University of Manchester. Winpenny's research is within the fields of inorganic chemistry and magnetochemistry, specifically the areas of single-molecule magnetism, inorganic synthesis, supramolecular chemistry and polymetallic cage complexes.

== Education ==
Winpenny was educated at Sandfields Comprehensive School, Port Talbot. He completed both his Bachelor of Science and Doctor of Philosophy degree at Imperial College London in 1985 and 1988, respectively. His PhD on New heterometallic polynuclear complexes was supervised by David Goodgame.

== Career ==
Upon completing his PhD, Winpenny completed his postdoctoral research with John Fackler, Jr at Texas A&M University from 1988 to 1989 where he researched on mass spectrometry of gold clusters. In 1990, he joined the University of Edinburgh as an academic, and in 2000, moved to The University of Manchester as the chair of inorganic chemistry.

Winpenny was the Associate Dean for Research in the University of Manchester Faculty of Science and Engineering from September 2008 to April 2010. He was also the director of the Photon Science Institute from October 2009 to April 2014. Winpenny was the head of the Department of Chemistry at the University of Manchester from August 2014 to April 2018, and was the director and chief scientific officer at Sci-Tron(Ltd.) from 2018 to 2024. He was awarded an Engineering and Physical Sciences Research Council (EPSRC) Established Career Fellowship (January 2018 to December 2022) and a European Research Council Advanced Fellowship from September 2018 to August 2022.

== Research ==
Winpenny developed a wide range of heterometallic rings, examples of molecular magnets,

In 2007, Winpenny reported the first intrinsic spin-lattice (T_{1}) and phasecoherence (T_{2}) relaxation times in molecular nanomagnets. The results showed that the value of T_{2} in deuterated samples were of several orders of magnitude longer than the duration of spin manipulations, which satisfies the prerequisite for the deployment of molecular nanomagnets in quantum information applications.

In 2016, Winpenny, Nicholas F. Chilton, and Yan‐Zhen Zheng report a dysprosium complex that showed the largest effective energy barrier to magnetic relaxation of U_{eff} = 1815 K. The research also showed the largest blocking temperature (T_{B}) for a monometallic complex.

=== Awards and nominations ===
- RSC Prize for Emerging Technologies in the area of materials (2016)
- Ludwig Mond Award (2016)
- Fellow of the Learned Society of Wales (2016)
- Tilden Prize (2011)
- Royal Society Wolfson Merit Award (2009)
