= Moses effect =

Magnetic effect

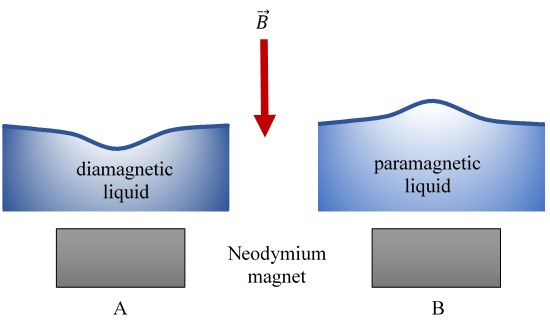
Direct (A) and inverse (B) Moses effects.

In physics, the Moses effect is a phenomenon of deformation of the surface of a diamagnetic liquid by a magnetic field. The effect was named after the biblical figure Moses, inspired by the mythological crossing of the Red Sea in the Old Testament.

The rapid progress in the development of neodymium magnets, supplying magnetic fields as high as c. 1 T, allows simple and inexpensive experiments related to the Moses effect and its visualization. The application of magnetic fields on the order of magnitude of 0.5-1 T results in the formation of the near-surface "well" with a depth of dozens of micrometers. In contrast, the surface of a paramagnetic liquid is raised by the magnetic field. This effect is called as the inverse Moses effect. It is usually latently suggested that the shape of the well arises from the interplay of magnetic force and gravity and the shape of the near-surface well is given by the following equation:

$$h(r)= \frac{\chi |\mathbf{B}(r)|^2}{2\rho g\mu_0}$$

where χ and ρ are the magnetic susceptibility and density of the liquid respectively, B is the magnetic field, g is the gravity acceleration, and μ_{0} is the magnetic permittivity of vacuum. Actually, the shape of the near surface well depends also on the surface tension of the liquid. The Moses effect enables trapping of floating diamagnetic particles and formation of micro-patterns. The application of a magnetic field (B≅0.5 T) on diamagnetic liquid/vapor interfaces enables the driving of floating diamagnetic bodies and soap bubbles.
