= Nicholas F. Chilton =

Australian chemist

Nicholas Chilton
- Born: Nicholas Frederick Chilton
- Education: Monash University (BSc); University of Manchester (PhD)
- Known for: Magnetochemistry; Computational Chemistry
- Awards: Philip Leverhulme Prize (2022) Harrison-Meldola Memorial Prizes (2021) Royal Society University Research Fellowship (2019)
- Scientific career
- Fields: Physics; Chemistry; Magnetism
- Workplaces: Monash University; University of Manchester; Australian National University
- Thesis: Magnetic Anisotropy of Transition Metal Complexes (2015)
- Doctoral advisor: Richard Winpenny; Eric McInnes
- Website: www.nfchilton.com

Nicholas Frederick Chilton is an Australian chemist and a Professor in the Research School of Chemistry at The Australian National University and The Department of Chemistry at The University of Manchester. His research is in the areas of magnetochemistry and computational chemistry, and includes the design of high-temperature single molecule magnets, molecular spin qubits for quantum information science, methods and tools for modelling magnetic calculations.

== Education ==
Chilton completed his Advanced Bachelor of Science (Honors) degree at Monash University in 2011 where he finished his final year project with Stuart R. Batten and Keith S. Murray. His research at Monash included the synthesis and characterization of low-symmetry dysprosium complexes, and mixed-metallic lanthanide-transition metal clusters, that display single molecule magnetism. During this time, he also designed a software program, PHI, for the calculation of the magnetic properties of paramagnetic coordination complexes. Chilton completed his Ph.D. on magnetochemistry at the University of Manchester, supervised by Richard Winpenny and Eric McInnes in 2015.

== Research and career ==
Chilton completed postdoctoral research at the Engineering and Physical Sciences Research Council National EPR facility in collaboration with the University of Manchester. In 2016, he was awarded the British Ramsay Memorial Fellowship (2016–2018) to research how coordination chemistry can be used to engineer specific magnetic states of lanthanide ions. From 2017, He began work as a Senior Lecturer and a Royal Society University Research Fellow in the Department of Chemistry at the University of Manchester. In 2021, he was promoted to Professor in Computational and theoretical chemistry, and in 2023 he moved to The Australian National University and holds a joint appointment with The University of Manchester.

Chilton's research is in the areas of computational chemistry and magnetochemistry, specifically on the design of high-temperature single molecule magnets, molecular spin qubits for quantum information science, understanding paramagnetic MRI contrast agents, unravelling the electronic structure of uranium coordination complexes, magnetic interactions between f-elements, and in developing computational methods and tools.

=== Notable work ===
In 2017, with synthetic chemist David P. Mills, Chilton led the magnetic characterization of a dysprosocenium ion single-molecule magnet, which exhibits magnetic hysteresis at 60 Kelvin.

Chilton has also collaborated in developing software to be used in chemical research, particularly in modelling magnetic relaxation and magnetic properties of coordination complexes. In 2013, with Alessandro Soncini he designed a computer program for the determination of the orientation of the magnetic anisotropy of the m_{J} = ±15/2 state of Dy^{III} via electrostatic optimization of the aspherical electron density distribution. He also designed a program named PHI for the calculation of the magnetic properties of paramagnetic coordination complexes in the same year. In 2019, with his post-doctoral researcher Daniel Reta, designed CC-FIT2, a tool for the fitting of experimental AC magnetic susceptibility data using the (generalized) Debye model, extraction of magnetic relaxation times with associated uncertainties, and fitting the temperature dependence of these data accounting for uncertainties in the underlying relaxation times.

=== Awards, honours and nominations ===
- 2023: Zasshikai Lectureship Prize, The University of Tokyo
- 2022: Philip Leverhulme Prize
- 2021: Harrison-Meldola Memorial Prizes
- 2020: Distinguished Achievement Medal: Teacher of the Year, The University of Manchester
- 2019: Royal Society University Research Fellowship
- 2019: Olivier Kahn International Award
- 2016: British Ramsay Memorial Fellowship
- 2015: Dalton Young Researchers Award

=== Publications ===
His major publications include:

- Liu, Jingjing; Ortu, Fabrizio; Reta, Daniel; Cleghorn, Jake A.; Yeoh, Yu Xuan; Goodwin, Conrad A.P.; Chilton, Nicholas F.; Mills, David .P. (2019). "Light Lanthanide Metallocenium Cations Exhibiting WeakEquatorial Anion Interactions". Chem. Eur. J. 25 (32): 7749–7758. doi:10.1002/chem.201901167. PMC 6637382. PMID 30994214.
- Gregson, Matthew P.; Ortu, Fabrizio; Reta, Daniel; Ding, You-Song; McInnes, Eric M.J.; Winpenny, Richard E.P.; Zheng, Yan-Zhen; Liddle, Stephen T.; Goodwin, Conrad A.P.; Chilton, Nicholas F.; Mills, David .P. (2019). "Studies of hysteresis and quantum tunnelling of the magnetisation in dysprosium(iii) single molecule magnets". Dalton Transactions. 48 (24): 8541–8545. doi:10.1039/C9DT01655D. PMID 31112169. S2CID 160012501.
- Nicholas, Hannah M.; Vonci, Michele; Loo, Song Wei; Murphy, Siobhan R.; McInnes, Eric M.J.; Winpenny, Richard E.P.; Cassim, Daniel; Goodwin, Conrad A.P.; Chilton, Nicholas F.; Mills, David .P. (2019). "Electronic structures of bent lanthanide(III) complexes with two N-donor ligands". Chemical Science. 10 (45): 10493–10502. doi:10.1039/C9SC03431E. PMC 7020784. PMID 32110338.
- Parmar, Vijay; Ma, Xiaozhou; Winpenny, Richard E.P.; Clerac, Rodolphe; Chilton, Nicholas F.; Mills, David .P (2020). "Probing relaxation dynamics in five-coordinate dysprosium single-molecule magnets". Chemistry – A European Journal. 26 (35): 7774–7778. doi:10.1002/chem.202001235. PMC 7383731. PMID 32216105.
