= Molecule-based magnets =

Class of materials

Molecule-based magnets (MBMs) or molecular magnets are magnetic materials composed of discrete molecules, typically either an organic molecule or a coordination compound. They typically have much lower Curie points than classical magnets, but remain ferro- or ferrimagnetic at the temperatures of interest (typically, room temperature). Essentially all common magnetic phenomena associated with conventional transition-metal and rare-earth magnets can be found in molecule-based magnets. Other properties are more favorable for industrial application: they can exhibit much lower density than classical magnets, and need be neither electrically conductive nor opaque.

== History ==
The first synthesis and characterization of MBMs was accomplished by Wickman and co-workers in 1967. This was a diethyldithiocarbamate-Fe(III) chloride compound.

In February 1992, Gatteschi and Sessoli published on MBMs with particular attention to the fabrication of systems in which stable organic radicals are coupled to metal ions. At that date, the highest Tc on record was measured by SQUID magnetometer as 30K.

The field exploded in 1996 with the publication of the book "Molecular Magnetism: From Molecular Assemblies to the Devices".

In February 2007, de Jong et al. grew thin-film TCNE MBM in situ, while in September 2007, photoinduced magnetism was demonstrated in a TCNE organic-based magnetic semiconductor.

By 2011, MBMs were known with a Curie point above room temperature. Essentially all of the common magnetic phenomena associated with conventional transition-metal magnets and rare-earth magnets could be found in molecule-based magnets, but also low density, transparency, low-temperature fabrication, and photoresponse.

== Theory ==
All magnets generate a stable net magnetic moment through unpaired electrons at identical crystallographic sites. These electrons generally prefer to adopt identical spins because of the quantum-mechanical exchange interaction. In classical magnets, the unpaired electrons are either located in nonbonding metal d- or f-type orbitals (in the case of metal alloys) or in metal-ligand bonds (in the case of complex salts; the so-called superexchange interaction).

In molecule-based magnets, the unpaired electrons may still locate in non- or weakly bonding metal orbitals or half-fill a main-group element's lone pair orbital, but are generally isolated within the molecule. Consequently, they have lower number density than a classical magnet, and poor geometric overlap between half-filled orbitals substantially reduces the exchange constant. Molecular solids also have much more flexible crystal lattices, and often strong local anisotropy. These properties reduce phonon-mediated coupling between the spin centers. As a result, magnetic ordering temperatures are much lower than metal/alloy-type magnets.

Nevertheless, in a molecule-based magnet, the exchange interaction is sufficiently large to achieve ferro- or ferrimagnetism at the temperatures of interest. In the related single-molecule magnets (SMMs), the exchange interaction is practically zero and the material is paramagnetic. Some industrial applications are the same, because the timescale for SMM thermal fluctuations exceeds many human activities (superparamagnetism).

== Examples ==
Like conventional magnets, they may be classified as hard or soft, depending on the magnitude of the coercive field.

Specific materials include purely organic magnets made of organic radicals for example p-nitrophenyl nitronyl nitroxides, decamethylferrocenium tetracyanoethenide, mixed coordination compounds with bridging organic radicals, Prussian blue related compounds, and charge-transfer complexes.

In 2015 oxo-dimeric Fe(salen)-based magnets ("anticancer nanomagnets") in a water suspension were shown to demonstrate intrinsic room temperature ferromagnetic behavior, as well as antitumor activity, with possible medical applications in chemotherapy, magnetic drug delivery, magnetic resonance imaging (MRI), and magnetic field-induced local hyperthermia therapy.
