= Anton Brugmans =

Dutch physicist

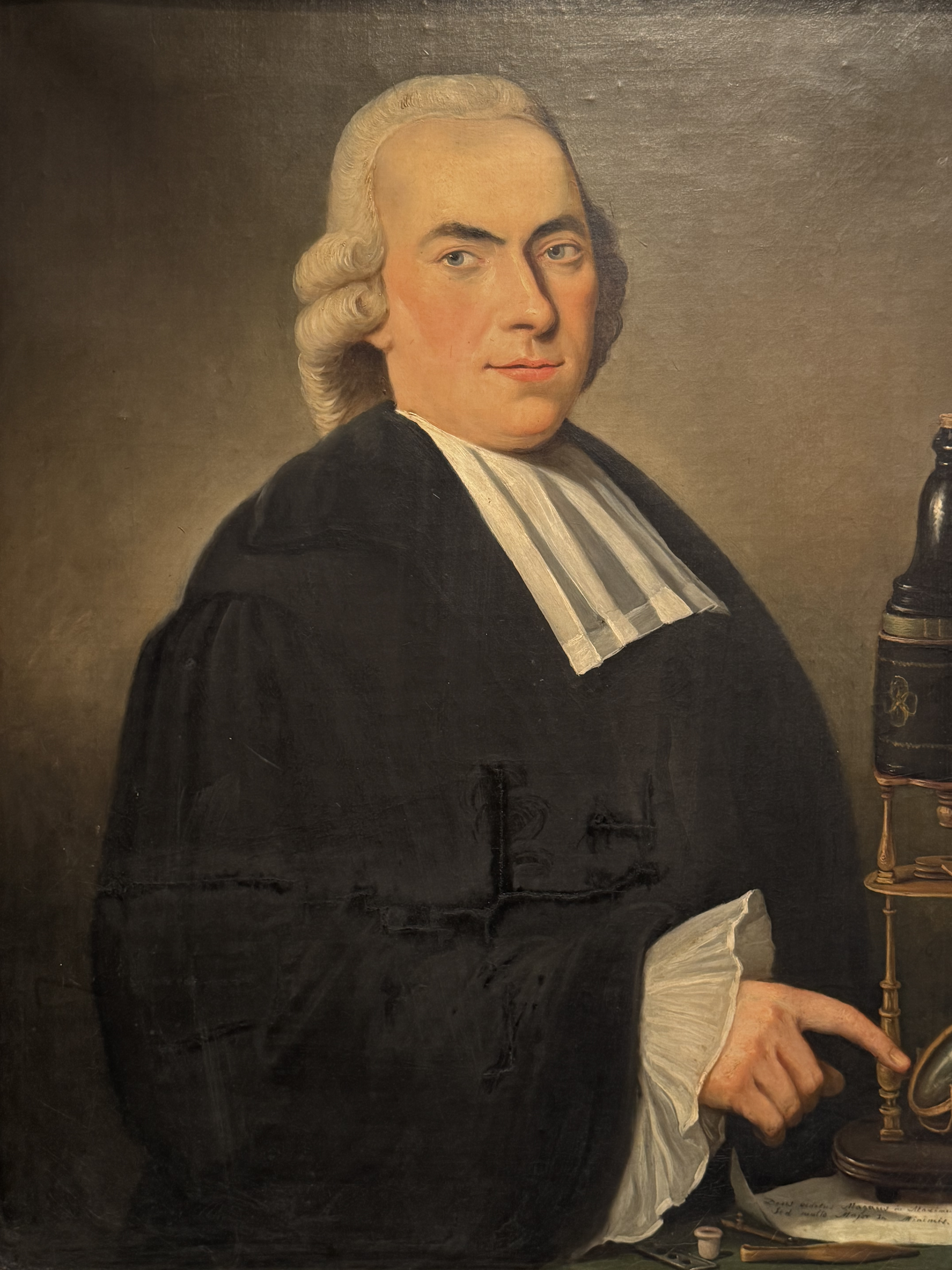
Portrait of Antonius Brugmans. 1761. Eise Eisinga Planetarium

Anton Brugmans (1732–1789) was a Dutch physicist who proposed a two-fluid theory of magnetism. He did magnetism experiments by putting objects on water or mercury, using surface tension to make them float and magnets to move them. He discovered the diamagnetism of bismuth.

== Publications ==
- Tentamina philosophica de materia magnetica eiusque actione in ferrum et magnetem (in Latin). Franeker: Willem Coulon. 1765.
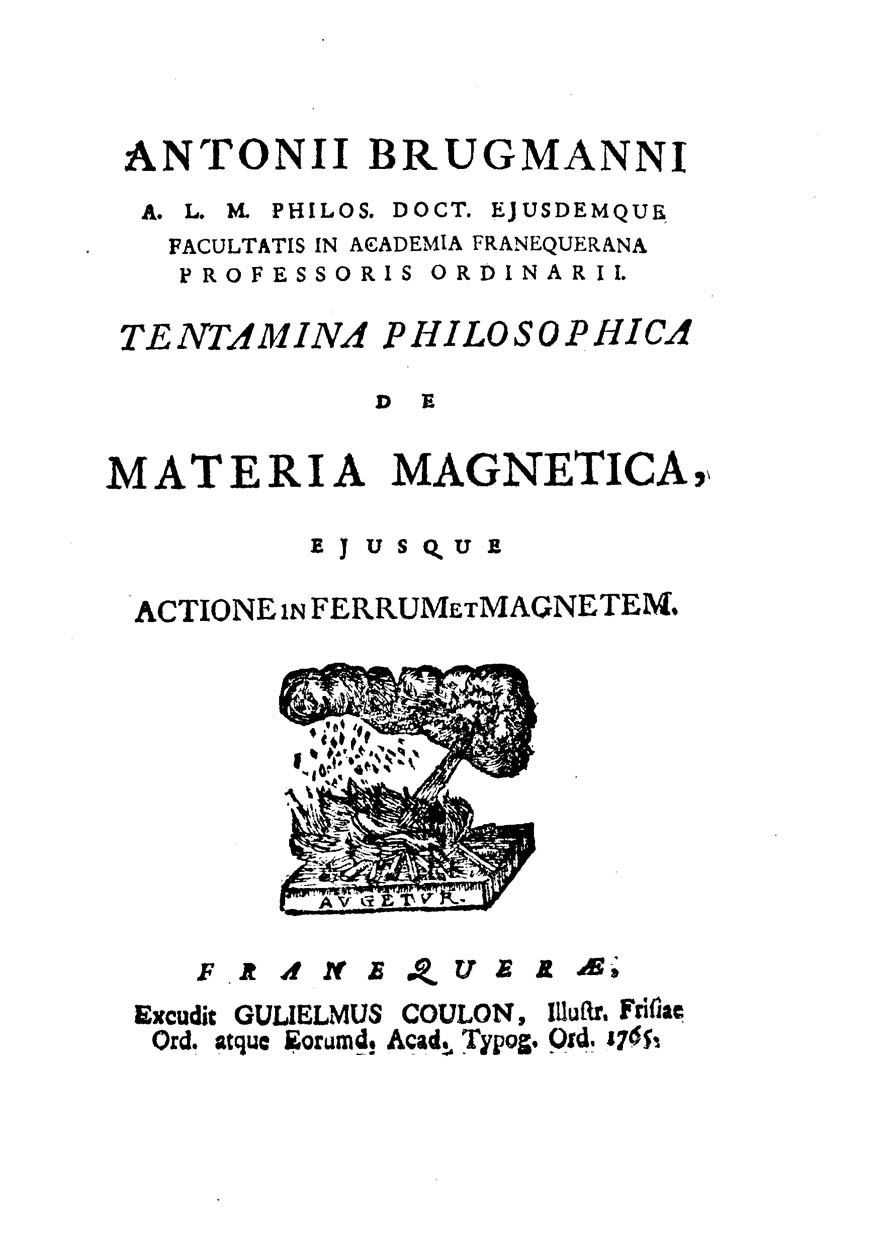
Tentamina philosophica de materia magnetica eiusque actione in ferrum et magnetem, 1765
