= Diamagnetic inequality =

Mathematical inequality relating the derivative of a function to its covariant derivative

In mathematics and physics, the diamagnetic inequality relates the Sobolev norm of the absolute value of a section of a line bundle to its covariant derivative. The diamagnetic inequality has an important physical interpretation, that a charged particle in a magnetic field has more energy in its ground state than it would in a vacuum.

To precisely state the inequality, let $L^2(\mathbb R^n)$ denote the usual Hilbert space of square-integrable functions, and $H^1(\mathbb R^n)$ the Sobolev space of square-integrable functions with square-integrable derivatives. Let $f, A_1, \dots, A_n$ be measurable functions on $\mathbb R^n$ and suppose that $A_j \in L^2_{\text{loc}} (\mathbb R^n)$ is real-valued, $f$ is complex-valued, and $f , (\partial_1 + iA_1)f, \dots, (\partial_n + iA_n)f \in L^2(\mathbb R^n)$. Then for almost every $x \in \mathbb R^n$,
$$|\nabla |f|(x)| \leq |(\nabla + iA)f(x)|.$$
In particular, $|f| \in H^1(\mathbb R^n)$.

== Proof ==
For this proof we follow Elliott H. Lieb and Michael Loss. From the assumptions, $\partial_j |f| \in L^1_{\text{loc}}(\mathbb R^n)$ when viewed in the sense of distributions and
$$\partial_j |f|(x) = \operatorname{Re}\left(\frac{\overline f(x)}{|f(x)|} \partial_j f(x)\right)$$
for almost every $x$ such that $f(x) \neq 0$ (and $\partial_j |f|(x) = 0$ if $f(x) = 0$). Moreover,
$$\operatorname{Re}\left(\frac{\overline f(x)}{|f(x)|} i A_j f(x)\right) = \operatorname{Im}(A_j) = 0.$$
So
$$\nabla |f|(x) = \operatorname{Re}\left(\frac{\overline f(x)}{|f(x)|} \mathbf D f(x)\right) \leq \left|\frac{\overline f(x)}{|f(x)|} \mathbf D f(x)\right| = |\mathbf D f(x)|$$
for almost every $x$ such that $f(x) \neq 0$. The case that $f(x) = 0$ is similar.

== Application to line bundles ==
Let $p: L \to \mathbb R^n$ be a U(1) line bundle, and let $A$ be a connection 1-form for $L$. In this situation, $A$ is real-valued, and the covariant derivative $\mathbf D$ satisfies $\mathbf Df_j = (\partial_j + iA_j)f$ for every section $f$. Here $\partial_j$ are the components of the trivial connection for $L$. If $A_j \in L^2_{\text{loc}} (\mathbb R^n)$ and $f , (\partial_1 + iA_1)f, \dots, (\partial_n + iA_n)f \in L^2(\mathbb R^n)$, then for almost every $x \in \mathbb R^n$, it follows from the diamagnetic inequality that
$$|\nabla |f|(x)| \leq |\mathbf Df(x)|.$$

The above case is of the most physical interest. We view $\mathbb R^n$ as Minkowski spacetime. Since the gauge group of electromagnetism is $U(1)$, connection 1-forms for $L$ are nothing more than the valid electromagnetic four-potentials on $\mathbb R^n$. If $F = dA$ is the electromagnetic tensor, then the massless Maxwell–Klein–Gordon system for a section $\phi$ of $L$ are
$$\begin{cases} \partial^\mu F_{\mu\nu} = \operatorname{Im}(\phi \mathbf D_\nu \phi) \\
\mathbf D^\mu \mathbf D_\mu \phi = 0\end{cases}$$
and the energy of this physical system is
$$\frac{||F(t)||_{L^2_x}^2}{2} + \frac{||\mathbf D \phi(t)||_{L^2_x}^2}{2}.$$
The diamagnetic inequality guarantees that the energy is minimized in the absence of electromagnetism, thus $A = 0$.

== See also ==
- Diamagnetism – Magnetic property of ordinary materials
