= Tony Orchard =

British chemist (1941–2005)

Anthony Frederick Orchard
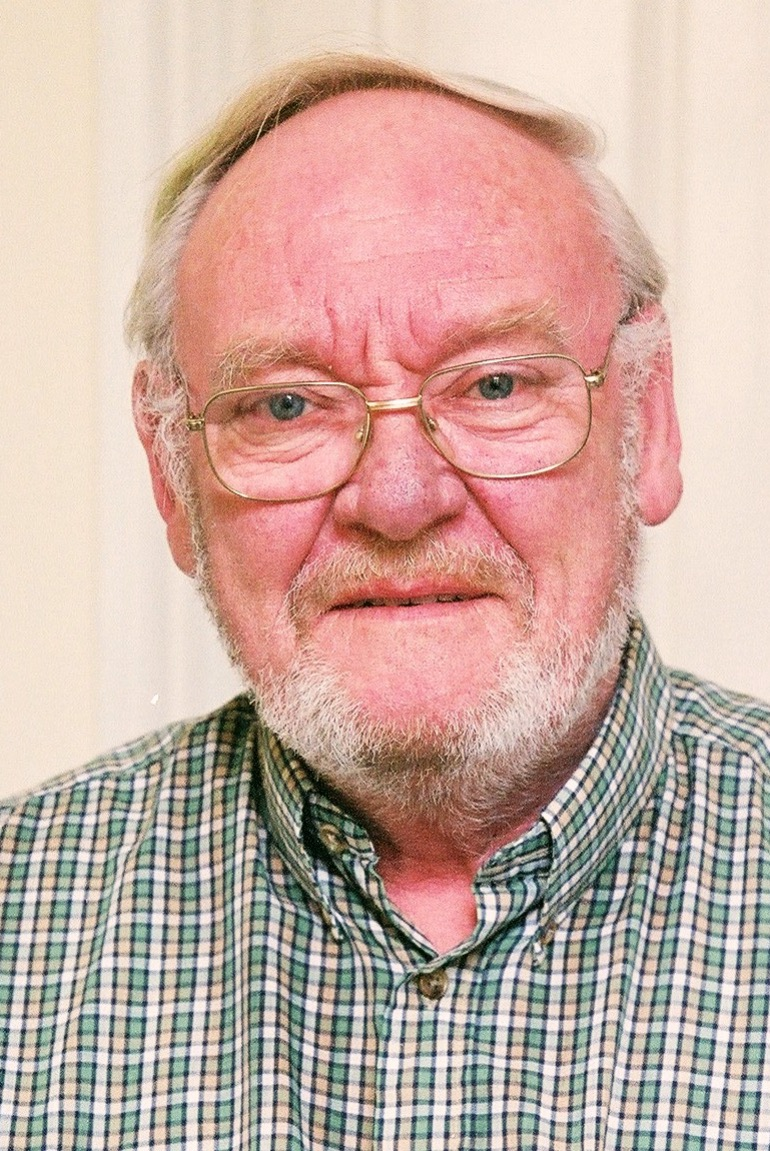
- From 2002. Courtesy of University College, Oxford.
- Born: 29 April 1941; Carmarthen, Wales
- Died: 19 November 2005 (aged 64); England
- Education: Wadham College, Oxford; Merton College, Oxford
- Known for: Photoelectron spectroscopy, magnetochemistry
- Scientific career
- Fields: Inorganic chemistry
- Workplaces: University College, Oxford

Anthony Frederick Orchard (13 March 1941 – 19 August 2005) was a Welsh inorganic chemist. His research contributed to laying the foundations of much modern consumer electronic technology.

Tony Orchard was born in Carmarthen, Wales, and moved to Swansea. He studied Chemistry first at Wadham College, Oxford as an undergraduate and then towards a DPhil doctoral degree in theoretical inorganic chemistry at Merton College, Oxford. He left Merton College before he had completed his doctorate at the age of 26 to become a Fellow in Inorganic Chemistry at University College in Oxford. He stayed at University College until his death.

During the 1970s, Orchard led a group of researchers working in the area of photoelectron spectroscopy. This enabled scientists to examine the electronic structure of materials. The research was important for technological innovations in modern electronics, helping with the development of advances such as the personal computer and mobile phone. He published the book Magnetochemistry in 2003.

In addition to his research contributions,, Orchard also helped to improve the system of undergraduate applications for chemistry at Oxford University.

== Personal life ==
Tony Orchard was an amateur sportsman, playing tennis and snooker. At an early age, he won snooker games with the later world champions Terry Griffiths and Ray Reardon. Orchard's friends included former United States president Bill Clinton, who he met during the 1960s when Clinton was studying at University College as a Rhodes Scholar. Orchard was married to his wife Jeanne and later divorced, with two sons and two daughters. He died aged 64 of colon cancer.
