= Pascal's constants =

In magnetism, Pascals’ constants are numbers used in the evaluation of the magnetic susceptibilities of coordination compounds. The magnetic susceptibility of a compound is the sum of the paramagnetic susceptibility associated with the unpaired electrons and the opposing diamagnetic susceptibility associated with electron pairs. Typically, the paramagnetic susceptibility greatly exceeds in magnitude the diamagnetic susceptibility. Thus, the diamagnetic correction is not considered for many purposes. For more precise analyses, however, the diamagnetic corrections are calculated by summing the contributions from the components of the molecule. These group contributions are Pascal’s constants. This analysis assumes that these group contributions are identical in all molecules. In general, the magnitude of Pascal’s constants correlates with the number of electrons in the groups. Groups with extended pi-delocalization have larger diamagnetic corrections compared to related saturated ligands.

These correction factors were first described by Paul Pascal in 1910. The values and the method of analysis have been revised several times.

== Tables ==
Representative Pascal constants (Note: values in CGS units, nn×10^{−6}/g atom)
cation	value	anion	value
Li^{+}	-1.0	F^{−}	-9.1
Na^{+}	-6.8	Cl^{−}	-23.4
K^{+}	-14.9	Br^{−}	-34.6
Rb^{+}	-22.5	I^{−}	-50.6
Cs^{+}	-35	OH^{−}	-12.0
NH_{4}^{+}	-40	CN^{−}	-13.0
Mg^{2+}	-5	NCS^{−}	-31.0
Fe^{2+}	-12.8	CO_{3}^{2−}	-29.5
Co^{2+}	-12.8	NO_{3}^{−}	-18.9
Ni^{2+}	-12.8	SO_{4}^{2−}	-40.1
Cu^{2+}	-12.8	ClO_{3}^{−}	-30.2
Zn^{2+}	-15	ClO_{4}^{−}	-32
Cd^{2+}	-24	BrO_{3}^{−}	-38.8
Hg^{2+}	-40.0	IO_{3}^{−}	-51.4
Pb^{2+}	-32.0	IO_{4}^{−}	-51.9

Representative Pascal constants
ligands	value
H_{2}O	-13
NH_{3}	-18
pyridine	-49
ethylenediamine	-46.5
bipyridyl	-105
phenanthroline	-128
acetylacetonate	-52
glycinate	-37
Triphenylphosphine	-167

Representative Pascal constants
In covalent compounds	value
H	-2.93
B	-7.0
C	-6.00
C (ring)	-6.24
N (open chain)	-5.57
N (ring)	-4.61
O	-4.6
F	-6.3
Cl	-20.1
Br	-30.6
I	-44.6

With organic molecules corrections are made for bond types other than C-C and C-H single bonds.

Correction constants
Bond type	value
C=C	+5.5
C≡C	+0.8
C=O	+6.3
COOH	-5.0
C≡N	0.0
