= Nanomagnet =

Magnetism at the molecular scale

In magnetism, a nanomagnet is a nanoscopic scale system that presents spontaneous magnetic order (magnetization) at zero applied magnetic field (remanence).

The small size of nanomagnets prevents the formation of magnetic domains (see single domain (magnetic)). The magnetization dynamics of sufficiently small nanomagnets at low temperatures, typically single-molecule magnets, presents quantum phenomena, such as macroscopic spin tunnelling. At larger temperatures, the magnetization undergoes random thermal fluctuations (superparamagnetism) which present a limit for the use of nanomagnets for permanent information storage.

Canonical examples of nanomagnets are grains of ferromagnetic metals (iron, cobalt, and nickel) and single-molecule magnets. The vast majority of nanomagnets feature transition metal (titanium, vanadium, chromium, manganese, iron, cobalt or nickel) or rare earth (Gadolinium, Europium, Erbium) magnetic atoms.

The ultimate limit in miniaturization of nanomagnets was achieved in 2016: individual Ho atoms present remanence when deposited on an atomically thin layer of MgO coating a silver film was reported by scientists from EPFL and ETH, in Switzerland. Before that, the smallest nanomagnets reported, attending to the number of magnetic atoms, were double decker phthalocyanes molecules with only one rare-earth atom. Other systems presenting remanence are nanoengineered Fe chains, deposited on Cu_{2}N/Cu(100) surfaces, showing either Neel or ferromagnetic ground states with in systems with as few as 5 Fe atoms with S=2. Canonical single-molecule magnets are the so-called Mn_{12} and Fe_{8} systems, with 12 and 8 transition metal atoms each and both with spin 10 (S = 10) ground states.

The phenomenon of zero field magnetization requires three conditions:

1. A ground state with finite spin
2. A magnetic anisotropy energy barrier
3. Long spin relaxation time.

Conditions 1 and 2, but not 3, have been demonstrated in a number of nanostructures, such as nanoparticles, nanoislands, and quantum dots with a controlled number of magnetic atoms (between 1 and 10).
