= Single-molecule magnet =

Metal-organic compound

A single-molecule magnet (SMM) is a metal-organic compound that has superparamagnetic behavior below a certain blocking temperature at the molecular scale. In this temperature range, an SMM exhibits magnetic hysteresis of purely molecular origin. In contrast to conventional bulk magnets and molecule-based magnets, collective long-range magnetic ordering of magnetic moments is not necessary.

Although the term "single-molecule magnet" was first employed in 1996, the first single-molecule magnet, [Mn_{12}O_{12}(OAc)_{16}(H_{2}O)_{4}] (nicknamed "Mn_{12}") was reported in 1991. This manganese oxide compound features a central Mn(IV)_{4}O_{4} cube surrounded by a ring of 8 Mn(III) units connected through bridging oxo ligands, and displays slow magnetic relaxation behavior up to temperatures of ca. 4 K.

Efforts in this field primarily focus on raising the operating temperatures of single-molecule magnets to liquid nitrogen temperature or room temperature in order to enable applications in magnetic memory. Along with raising the blocking temperature, efforts are being made to develop SMMs with high energy barriers to prevent fast spin reorientation. Recent acceleration in this field of research has resulted in significant enhancements of single-molecule magnet operating temperatures to above 70 K.

== Measurement ==
=== Arrhenius behavior of magnetic relaxation ===
Because of single-molecule magnets' magnetic anisotropy, the magnetic moment has usually only two stable orientations antiparallel to each other, separated by an energy barrier. The stable orientations define the molecule's so called “easy axis”. At finite temperature, there is a finite probability for the magnetization to flip and reverse its direction. Identical to a superparamagnet, the mean time between two flips is called the Néel relaxation time and is given by the following Néel–Arrhenius equation:

$\tau^{-1} = \tau_0^{-1}\exp\left ( \frac{-U_{eff}}{k_BT} \right )$

where:

- τ is the magnetic relaxation time, or the average amount of time that it takes for the molecule's magnetization to randomly flip as a result of thermal fluctuations
- τ_{0} is a length of time, characteristic of the material, called the attempt time or attempt period (its reciprocal is called the attempt frequency); its typical value is between 10^{−9} and 10^{−10} second
- U_{eff} is the energy barrier associated with the magnetization moving from its initial easy axis direction, through a “hard plane”, to the other easy axis direction. The barrier U_{eff} is generally reported in cm^{−1} or in kelvins.
- k_{B} is the Boltzmann constant
- T is the temperature

This magnetic relaxation time, τ, can be anywhere from a few nanoseconds to years or much longer.

=== Magnetic blocking temperature ===
The so-called magnetic blocking temperature, T_{B}, is defined as the temperature below which the relaxation of the magnetization becomes slow compared to the time scale of a particular investigation technique. Historically, the blocking temperature for single-molecule magnets has been defined as the temperature at which the molecule's magnetic relaxation time, τ, is 100 seconds. This definition is the current standard for comparison of single-molecule magnet properties, but otherwise is not technologically significant. There is typically a correlation between increasing an SMM's blocking temperature and energy barrier. The average blocking temperature for SMMs is 4K. Dy-metallocenium salts are the most recent SMM to achieve the highest temperature of magnetic hysteresis, greater than that of liquid nitrogen.

=== Intramolecular magnetic exchange ===
The magnetic coupling between the spins of the metal ions is mediated by superexchange interactions and can be described by the following isotropic Heisenberg Hamiltonian:

$$\hat{\mathcal H}_{HB} = -\sum_{i<j} J_{i,j} \mathbf{S}_i \cdot \mathbf{S}_j,$$

where $J_{i,j}$ is the coupling constant between spin i (operator $\mathbf{S}_i$) and spin j (operator $\mathbf{S}_j$). For positive J the coupling is called ferromagnetic (parallel alignment of spins) and for negative J the coupling is called antiferromagnetic (antiparallel alignment of spins): a high spin ground state, a high zero-field-splitting (due to high magnetic anisotropy), and negligible magnetic interaction between molecules.

The combination of these properties can lead to an energy barrier, so that at low temperatures the system can be trapped in one of the high-spin energy wells.

=== Barrier to magnetic relaxation ===
A single-molecule magnet can have a positive or negative magnetic moment, and the energy barrier between these two states greatly determines the molecule's relaxation time. This barrier depends on the total spin of the molecule's ground state and on its magnetic anisotropy. The latter quantity can be studied with EPR spectroscopy.

== Performance ==
The performance of single-molecule magnets is typically defined by two parameters: the effective barrier to slow magnetic relaxation, U_{eff}, and the magnetic blocking temperature, T_{B}. While these two variables are linked, only the latter variable, T_{B}, directly reflects the performance of the single-molecule magnet in practical use. In contrast, U_{eff}, the thermal barrier to slow magnetic relaxation, only correlates to T_{B} when the molecule's magnetic relaxation behavior is perfectly Arrhenius in nature.

The table below lists representative and record 100-s magnetic blocking temperatures and U_{eff} values that have been reported for single-molecule magnets.

Complex	Type	T_{B} (100-s; K)	U_{eff} (cm^{−1})	Ref.	Year Reported
[Mn_{12}O_{12}(OAc)_{16}(H_{2}O)_{4}]	cluster	3 K	42 cm^{−1}		1991
[K(18-crown-6)(THF)_{2}][{[(Me_{3}Si)_{2}N]_{2}(THF)Tb}_{2}(μ-η_{2}:η_{2}-N_{2})]	cluster	14 K	227 cm^{−1}		2011
Tb(Cp^{iPr5})_{2}	single-ion	52 K	1205 cm^{−1}		2019
[Dy(Cp^{ttt})_{2}][B(C_{6}F_{5})_{4}]*	single-ion	56 K	1219 cm^{−1}		2017
[Dy(Cp^{iPr4Me})_{2}][B(C_{6}F_{5})_{4}]	single-ion	62 K	1468 cm^{−1}		2018
[^{t}BuPO(NH^{i}Pr)_{2}Dy(H_{2}O)][I_{3}]	single-ion	2.4 K	452 cm^{−1}		2016
[Dy(Cp^{iPr4H})_{2}][B(C_{6}F_{5})_{4}]	single-ion	17 K	1285 cm^{−1}		2018
[Dy(Cp^{iPr5})(Cp^{Me5})][B(C_{6}F_{5})_{4}]	single-ion	67 K	1541 cm^{−1}		2018
[Dy(Cp^{iPr4Et})_{2}][B(C_{6}F_{5})_{4}]	single-ion	59 K	1380 cm^{−1}		2018
[Dy(Cp^{iPr5})_{2}][B(C_{6}F_{5})_{4}]	single-ion	56 K	1334 cm^{−1}		2018
[Dy(O^{t}Bu)_{2}(py)_{5}][BPh_{4}]	single-ion	12 K	1264 cm^{−1}		2016

Abbreviations: OAc=acetate, Cp^{ttt}=1,2,4‐tri(tert‐butyl)cyclopentadienide, Cp^{Me5}= 1,2,3,4,5-penta(methyl)cyclopentadienide, Cp^{iPr4H}= 1,2,3,4-tetra(isopropyl)cyclopentadienide, Cp^{iPr4Me}= 1,2,3,4-tetra(isopropyl)-5-(methyl)cyclopentadienide, Cp^{iPr4Et}= 1-(ethyl)-2,3,4,5-tetra(isopropyl)cyclopentadienide, Cp^{iPr5}= 1,2,3,4,5-penta(isopropyl)cyclopentadienide

*indicates parameters from magnetically dilute samples

== Types ==
=== Metal clusters ===
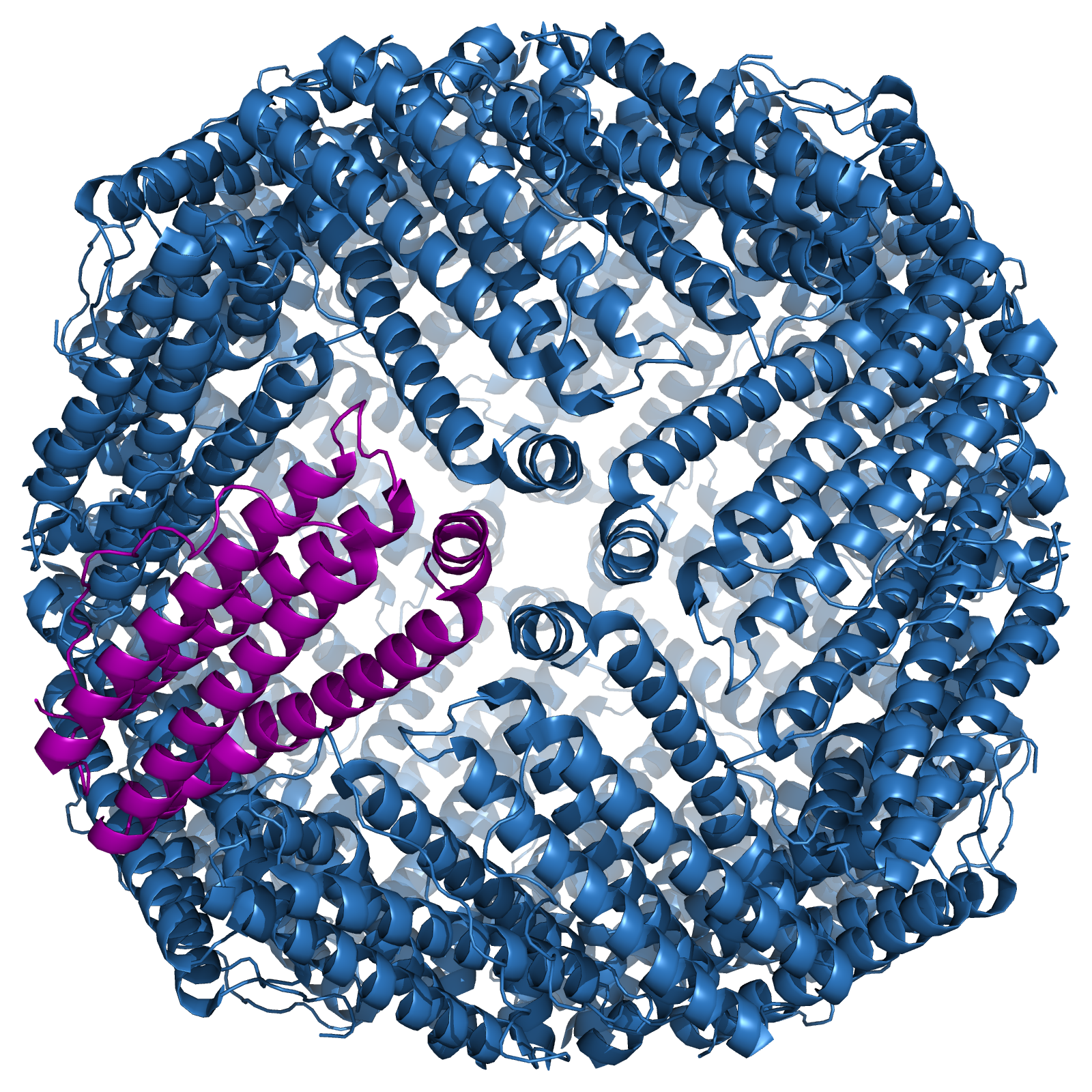
Ferritin

Metal clusters formed the basis of the first decade-plus of single-molecule magnet research, beginning with the archetype of single-molecule magnets, "Mn_{12}". This complex is a polymetallic manganese (Mn) complex having the formula [Mn_{12}O_{12}(OAc)_{16}(H_{2}O)_{4}], where OAc stands for acetate. It has the remarkable property of showing an extremely slow relaxation of their magnetization below a blocking temperature. [Mn_{12}O_{12}(OAc)_{16}(H_{2}O)_{4}]·4H_{2}O·2AcOH, which is called "Mn_{12}-acetate" is a common form of this used in research.

Single-molecule magnets are also based on iron clusters because they potentially have large spin states. In addition, the biomolecule ferritin is also considered a nanomagnet. In the cluster Fe_{8}Br the cation Fe_{8} stands for [Fe_{8}O_{2}(OH)_{12}(tacn)_{6}]^{8+}, with tacn representing 1,4,7-triazacyclononane.

The ferrous cube complex [Fe_{4}(sae)_{4}(MeOH)_{4}] was the first example of a single-molecule magnet involving an Fe(II) cluster, and the core of this complex is a slightly distorted cube with Fe and O atoms on alternating corners. Remarkably, this single-molecule magnet exhibits non-collinear magnetism, in which the atomic spin moments of the four Fe atoms point in opposite directions along two nearly perpendicular axes. Theoretical computations showed that approximately two magnetic electrons are localized on each Fe atom, with the other atoms being nearly nonmagnetic, and the spin–orbit-coupling potential energy surface has three local energy minima with a magnetic anisotropy barrier just below 3 meV.

== Applications ==
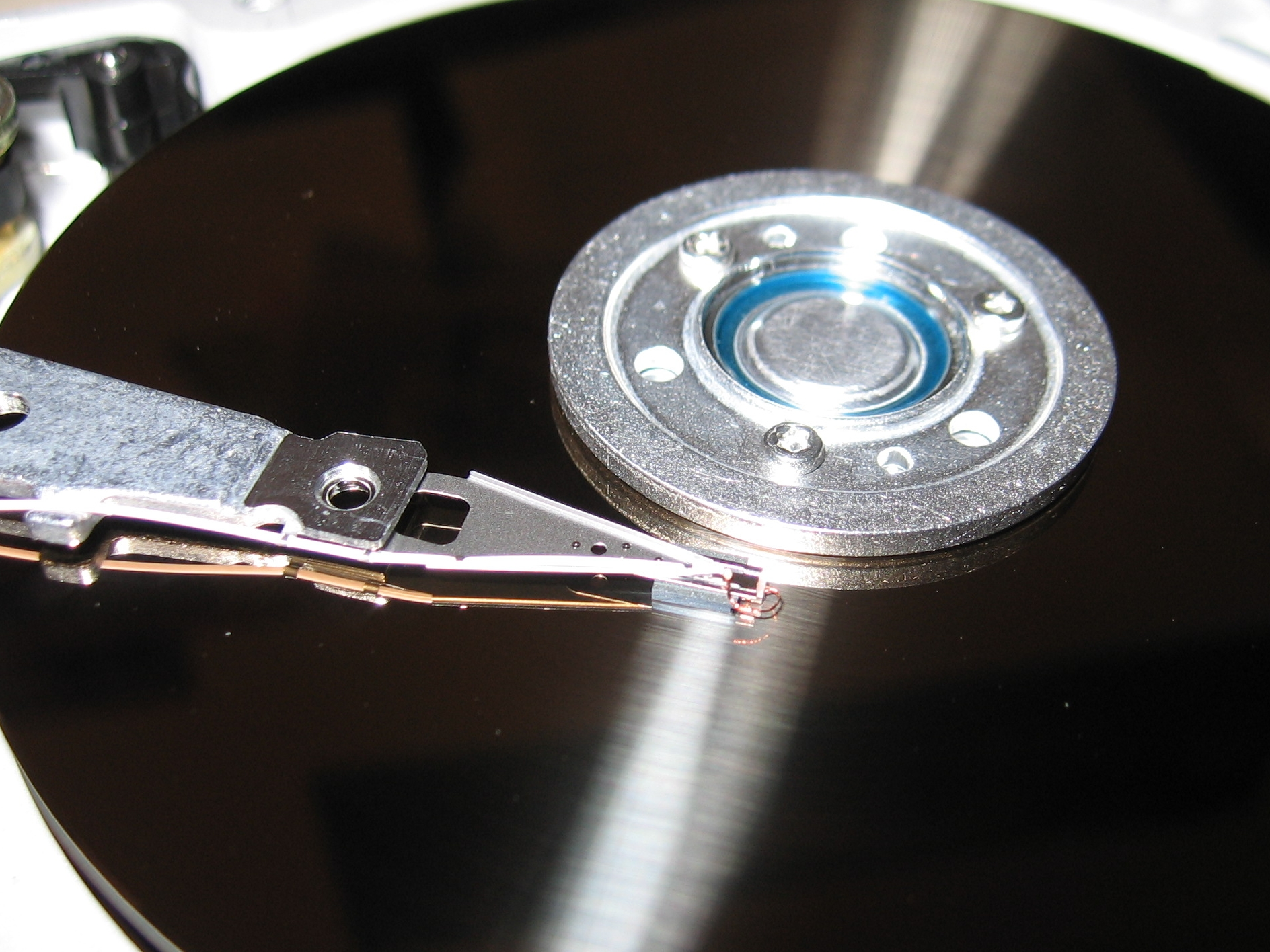
One possible use of SMMs is superior magnetic thin films to coat hard disks.

There are many discovered types and potential uses. Single-molecule magnets represent a molecular approach to nanomagnets (nanoscale magnetic particles).

Due to the typically large, bi-stable spin anisotropy, single-molecule magnets promise the realization of perhaps the smallest practical unit for magnetic memory, and thus are possible building blocks for a quantum computer. Consequently, many groups have devoted great efforts into synthesis of additional single-molecule magnets. Single-molecule magnets have been considered as potential building blocks for quantum computers. A single-molecule magnet is a system of many interacting spins with clearly defined low-lying energy levels. The high symmetry of the single-molecule magnet allows for a simplification of the spins that can be controllable in external magnetic fields. Single-molecule magnets display strong anisotropy, a property which allows a material to assume a variation of properties in different orientations. Anisotropy ensures that a collection of independent spins would be advantageous for quantum computing applications. A large amount of independent spins compared to a singular spin, permits the creation of a larger qubit and therefore a larger faculty of memory. Superposition and interference of the independent spins also allows for further simplification of classical computation algorithms and queries.

Theoretically, quantum computers can overcome the physical limitations presented by classical computers by encoding and decoding quantum states. Single-molecule magnets have been utilized for the Grover algorithm, a quantum search theory. The quantum search problem typically requests for a specific element to be retrieved from an unordered database. Classically the element would be retrieved after N/2 attempts, however a quantum search utilizes superpositions of data in order to retrieve the element, theoretically reducing the search to a single query. Single molecular magnets are considered ideal for this function due to their cluster of independent spins. A study conducted by Leuenberger and Loss, specifically utilized crystals to amplify the moment of the single spin molecule magnets Mn_{12} and Fe_{8}. Mn_{12} and Fe_{8} were both found to be ideal for memory storage with a retrieval time of approximately 10^{−10} seconds.

Another approach to information storage with SMM Fe_{4} involves the application of a gate voltage for a state transition from neutral to anionic. Using electrically gated molecular magnets offers the advantage of control over the cluster of spins during a shortened time scale. The electric field can be applied to the SMM using a tunneling microscope tip or a strip-line. The corresponding changes in conductance are unaffected by the magnetic states, proving that information storage could be performed at much higher temperatures than the blocking temperature. The specific mode of information transfer includes DVD to another readable medium, as shown with Mn_{12} patterned molecules on polymers.

Another application for SMMs is in magnetocaloric refrigerants . A machine learning approach using experimental data has been able to predict novel SMMs that would have large entropy changes, and therefore more suitable for magnetic refrigeration. Three hypothetical SMMs are proposed for experimental synthesis:Cr_{2}Gd_{2}(OAc)^{+}_{5}, Mn_{2}Gd_{2}(OAc)^{+}_{5}, [Fe_{4}Gd_{6}(O_{3}PCH_{2}Ph)_{6}(O_{2}CtBu)_{14}(MeCN)_{2}]. The main SMM characteristics that contribute to the entropy properties include dimensionality and the coordinating ligands.

In addition, single-molecule magnets have provided physicists with useful test-beds for the study of quantum mechanics. Macroscopic quantum tunneling of the magnetization was first observed in Mn_{12}O_{12}, characterized by evenly spaced steps in the hysteresis curve. The periodic quenching of this tunneling rate in the compound Fe_{8} has been observed and explained with geometric phases.

== See also ==
- Ferromagnetism
- Antiferromagnetism
- Magnetic anisotropy
- Single-molecule experiment
- Magnetism
- Superparamagnetism
- Magnetochemistry
