= Quadrupole mass analyzer =

Type of mass spectrometer

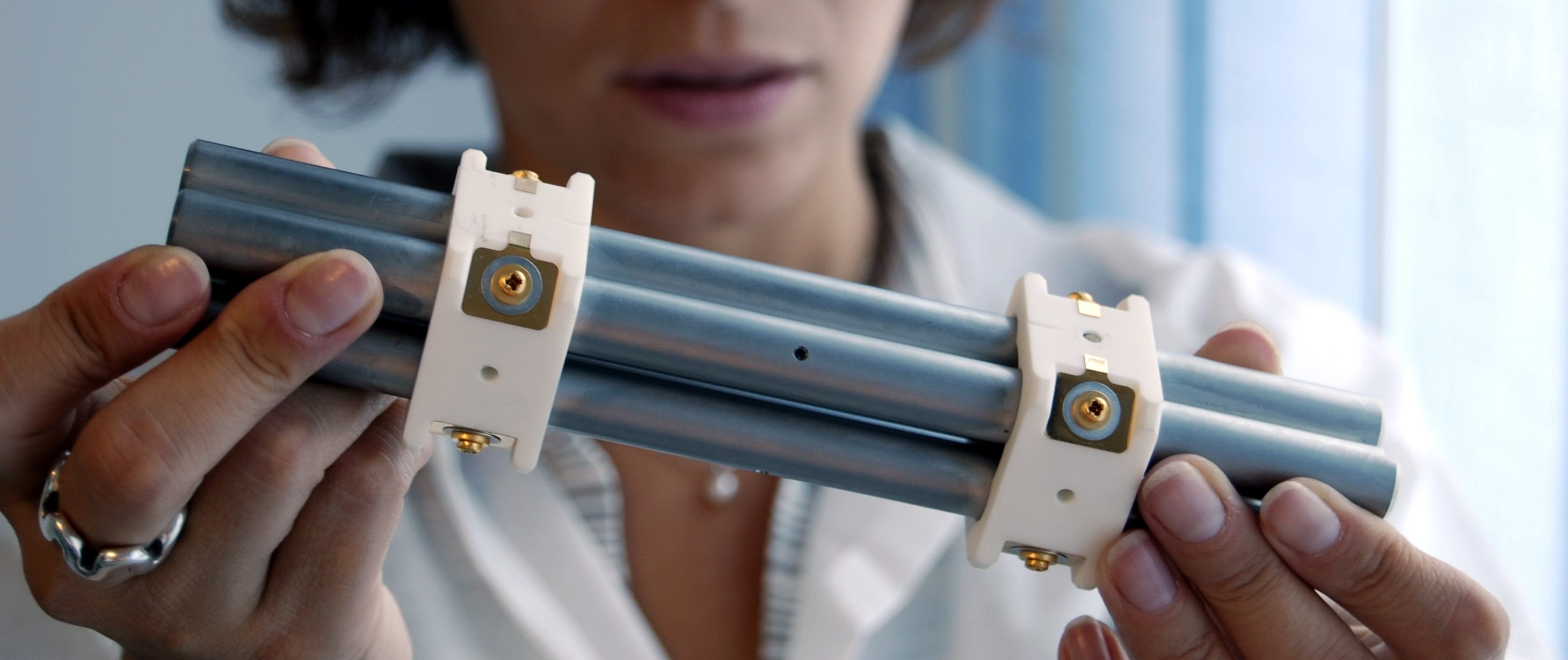
Quadrupole elements

In mass spectrometry, the quadrupole mass analyzer (or quadrupole mass filter) is a type of mass analyzer originally conceived by Nobel laureate Wolfgang Paul and his student Helmut Steinwedel. As the name implies, it consists of four cylindrical rods, set parallel to each other. In a quadrupole mass spectrometer (QMS) the quadrupole is the mass analyzer – the component of the instrument responsible for selecting sample ions based on their mass-to-charge ratio (m/z). Ions are separated in a quadrupole based on the stability of their trajectories in the oscillating electric fields that are applied to the rods.

== Principle of operation ==
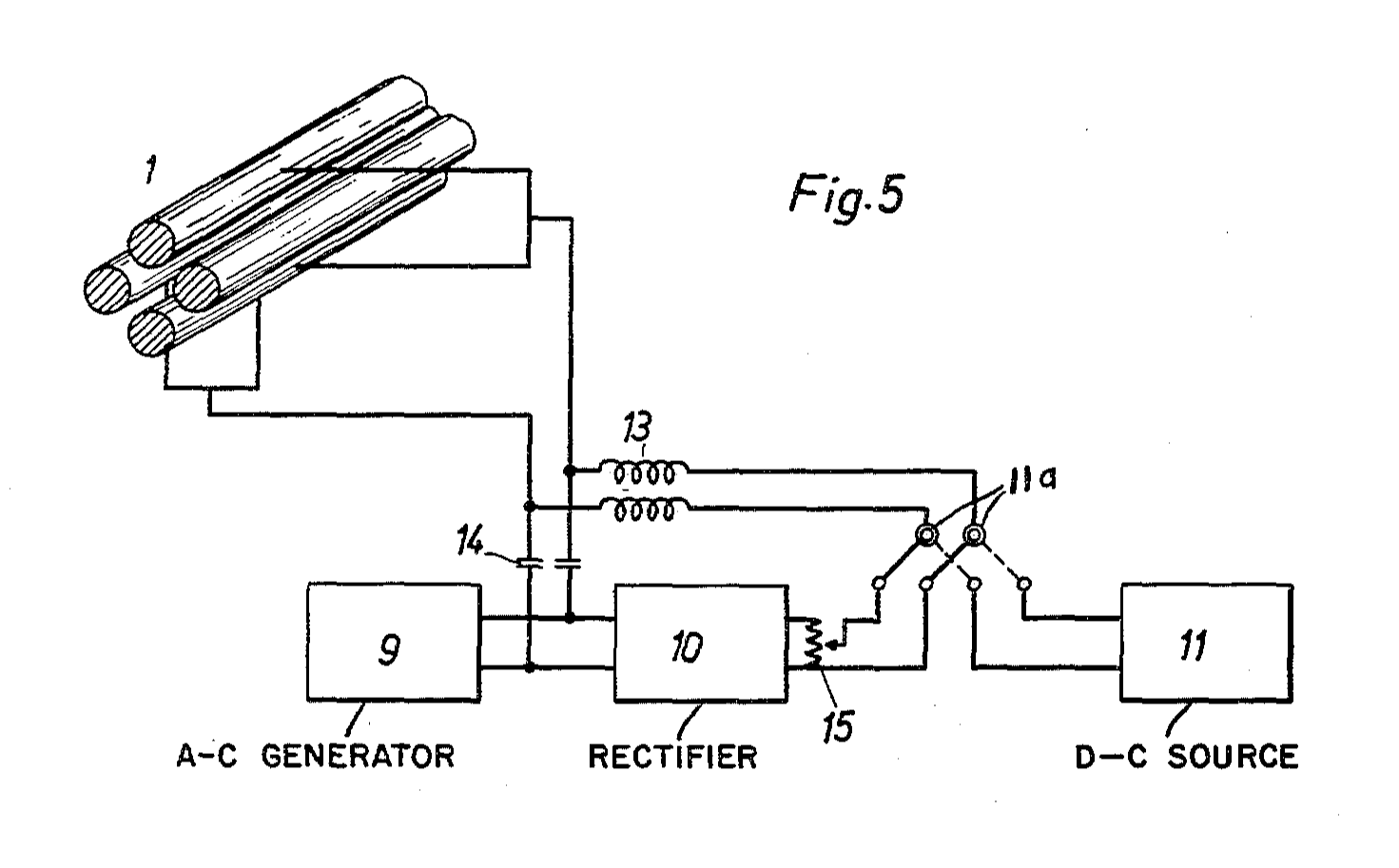
Image from US Patent "Apparatus for separating charged particles of different specific charges"

The quadrupole consists of four parallel metal rods. Each opposing rod pair is connected together electrically, and a radio frequency (RF) voltage with a DC offset voltage is applied between one pair of rods and the other. Ions travel down the quadrupole between the rods. Only ions of a certain mass-to-charge ratio will reach the detector for a given ratio of voltages: other ions have unstable trajectories and will collide with the rods. This permits selection of an ion with a particular m/z or allows the operator to scan for a range of m/z-values by continuously varying the applied voltage. Mathematically this can be modeled with the help of the Mathieu differential equation.

Ion path through a quadrupole

Ideally, the rods are hyperbolic, however cylindrical rods with a specific ratio of rod diameter-to-spacing provide an easier-to-manufacture adequate approximation to hyperbolas. Small variations in the ratio have large effects on resolution and peak shape. Different manufacturers choose slightly different ratios to fine-tune operating characteristics in context of anticipated application requirements. Since the 1980s, the MAT company and subsequently Finnigan Instrument Corporation used hyperbolic rods produced with a mechanical tolerance of 0.001 mm, whose exact production process was a well-kept secret within the company.

== Multiple quadrupoles, hybrids and variations ==
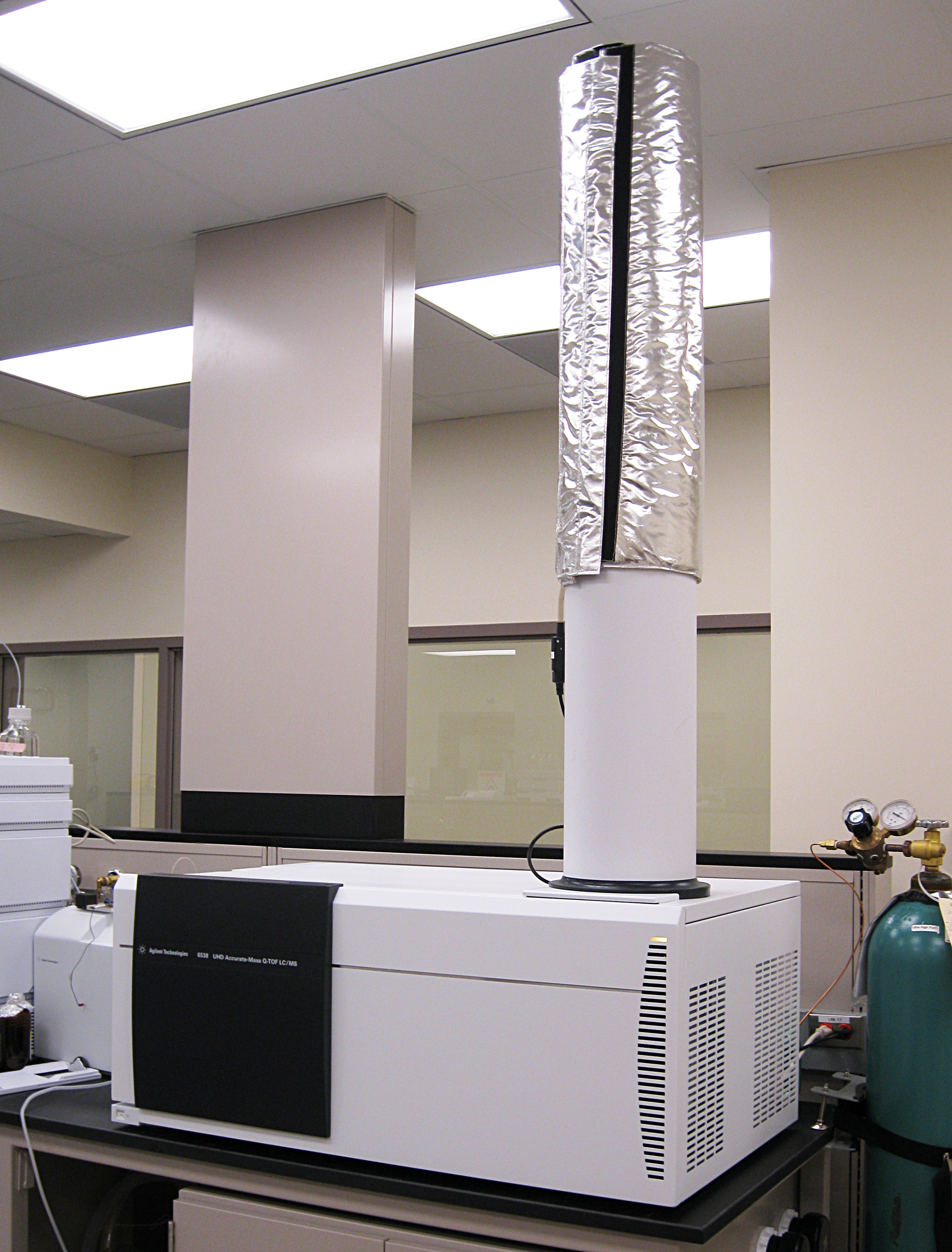
Hybrid quadrupole time-of-flight mass spectrometer

A linear series of three quadrupoles is known as a triple quadrupole mass spectrometer. The first (Q_{1}) and third (Q_{3}) quadrupoles act as mass filters, and the middle (q_{2}) quadrupole is employed as a collision cell. This collision cell is an RF-only quadrupole (non-mass filtering) using Ar, He, or N_{2} gas (~10^{−3} Torr, ~30 eV) for collision induced dissociation of selected parent ion(s) from Q_{1}. Subsequent fragments are passed through to Q_{3} where they may be filtered or fully scanned.

This process allows for the study of fragments that are useful in structural elucidation by tandem mass spectrometry. For example, the Q_{1} may be set to 'filter' for a drug ion of known mass, which is fragmented in q_{2}. The third quadrupole (Q_{3}) can then be set to scan the entire m/z range, giving information on the intensities of the fragments. Thus, the structure of the original ion can be deduced.

The arrangement of three quadrupoles was first developed by Jim Morrison of La Trobe University in Australia for the purpose of studying the photodissociation of gas-phase ions. The first triple-quadrupole mass spectrometer was developed at Michigan State University by Christie Enke and graduate student Richard Yost in the late 1970s.

Quadrupoles can be used in hybrid mass spectrometers. For example, a sector instrument can be combined with a collision quadrupole and quadrupole mass analyzer to form a hybrid instrument.

A mass-selecting quadrupole and collision quadrupole with time-of-flight device as the second mass selection stage is a hybrid known as a quadrupole time-of-flight mass spectrometer (QTOF MS). Quadrupole-quadrupole-time-of-flight (QqTOF) configurations are also possible and used especially the mass spectrometry of peptides and other large biological polymers.

A variant of the quadrupole mass analyzer called the monopole was invented by von Zahn which operates with two electrodes and generates one quarter of the quadrupole field. It has one circular electrode and one V-shaped electrode. The performance is, however, lower than that of a quadrupole mass analyzer.

An enhancement to the performance of the quadrupole mass analyzer has been demonstrated to occur when a magnetic field is applied to the instrument. Manifold improvements in resolution and sensitivity have been reported for a magnetic field applied in various orientations to a QMS.

== Applications ==
These mass spectrometers excel at applications where particular ions of interest are being studied because they can stay tuned on a single ion for extended periods of time. One place where this is useful is in liquid chromatography-mass spectrometry or gas chromatography-mass spectrometry where they serve as exceptionally high specificity detectors. Quadrupole instruments are often reasonably priced and make good multi-purpose instruments. A single quadrupole mass spectrometer with an electron impact ionizer is used as a standalone analyzer in residual gas analyzers, real-time gas analyzers, plasma diagnostics and SIMS surface analysis systems.

== See also ==
- Fourier transform ion cyclotron resonance
- Quadrupole magnet
- Radio-frequency quadrupole beam cooler
