= Instrumental chemistry =

Study of analytes using scientific instruments

Instrumental analysis is a field of analytical chemistry that investigates analytes using scientific instruments.

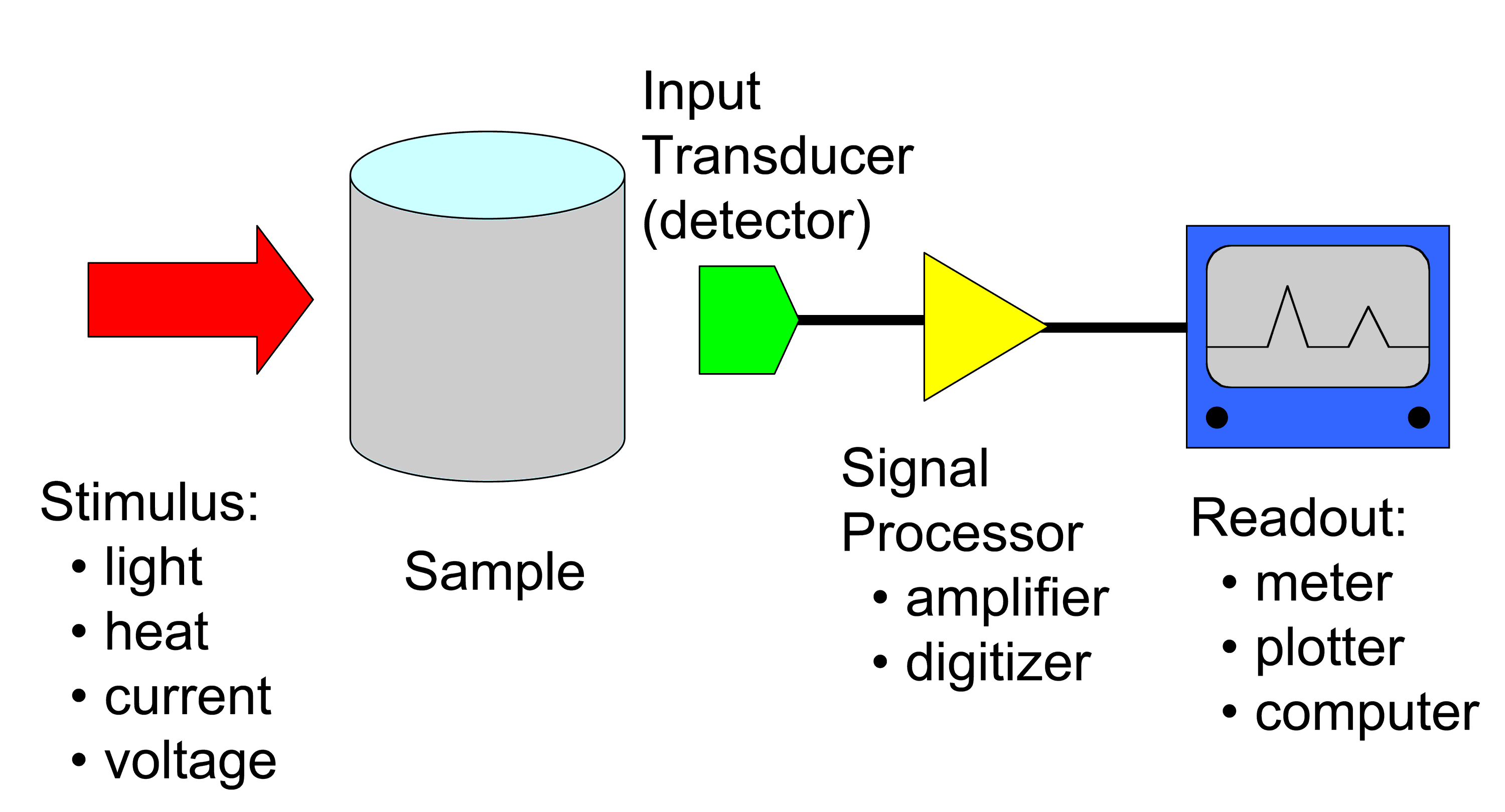
Block diagram of an analytical instrument showing the stimulus and measurement of response

== Spectroscopy ==
Spectroscopy measures the interaction of the molecules with electromagnetic radiation. Spectroscopy consists of many different applications such as atomic absorption spectroscopy, atomic emission spectroscopy, ultraviolet-visible spectroscopy, X-ray fluorescence spectroscopy, infrared spectroscopy, Raman spectroscopy, nuclear magnetic resonance spectroscopy, photoemission spectroscopy, Mössbauer spectroscopy, and circular dichroism spectroscopy.

== Nuclear spectroscopy ==
Methods of nuclear spectroscopy use properties of a nucleus to probe a material's properties, especially the material's local structure. Common methods include nuclear magnetic resonance spectroscopy (NMR), Mössbauer spectroscopy (MBS), and perturbed angular correlation (PAC).

== Mass spectrometry ==
Mass spectrometry measures mass-to-charge ratio of molecules using electric and magnetic fields. There are several ionization methods: electron ionization, chemical ionization, electrospray, fast atom bombardment, matrix-assisted laser desorption/ionization, and others. Also, mass spectrometry is categorized by approaches of mass analyzers: magnetic-sector, quadrupole mass analyzer, quadrupole ion trap, time-of-flight, Fourier transform ion cyclotron resonance, and so on.

== Crystallography ==
Crystallography is a technique that characterizes the chemical structure of materials at the atomic level by analyzing the diffraction patterns of electromagnetic radiation or particles that have been deflected by atoms in the material. X-rays are most commonly used. From the raw data, the relative placement of atoms in space may be determined.

== Electrochemical analysis ==
Electroanalytical methods measure the electric potential in volts and/or the electric current in amps in an electrochemical cell containing the analyte. These methods can be categorized according to which aspects of the cell are controlled and which are measured. The three main categories are potentiometry (the difference in electrode potentials is measured), coulometry (the cell's current is measured over time), and voltammetry (the cell's current is measured while actively altering the cell's potential).

== Thermal analysis ==
Calorimetry and thermogravimetric analysis measure the interaction of a material and heat.

== Separation ==
Separation processes are used to decrease the complexity of material mixtures. Chromatography and electrophoresis are representative of this field.

== Hybrid techniques ==
Combinations of the above techniques produce "hybrid" or "hyphenated" techniques. Several examples are in popular use today and new hybrid techniques are under development.

Hyphenated separation techniques refer to a combination of two or more techniques to separate chemicals from solutions and detect them. Most often, the other technique is some form of chromatography. Hyphenated techniques are widely used in chemistry and biochemistry. A slash is sometimes used instead of hyphen, especially if the name of one of the methods contains a hyphen itself.

Examples of hyphenated techniques:

- Gas chromatography-mass spectrometry (GC-MS)
- Liquid chromatography–mass spectrometry (LC-MS)
- Liquid chromatography-infrared spectroscopy (LC-IR)
- High-performance liquid chromatography/electrospray ionization-mass spectrometry (HPLC/ESI-MS)
- Chromatography-diode-array detection (LC-DAD)
- Capillary electrophoresis-mass spectrometry (CE-MS)
- Capillary electrophoresis-ultraviolet-visible spectroscopy (CE-UV)
- Ion-mobility spectrometry–mass spectrometry
- Prolate trochoidal mass spectrometer

== Microscopy ==
The visualization of single molecules, single biological cells, biological tissues and nanomaterials is very important and attractive approach in analytical science. Also, hybridization with other traditional analytical tools is revolutionizing analytical science. Microscopy can be categorized into three different fields: optical microscopy, electron microscopy, and scanning probe microscopy. Recently, this field has been rapidly progressing because of the rapid development of the computer and camera industries.

== Lab-on-a-chip ==
Devices that integrate multiple laboratory functions on a single chip of only a few square millimeters or centimeters in size and that are capable of handling extremely small fluid volumes down to less than picoliters.

== See also ==
- Characterization (materials science)
