= Association of Biomolecular Resource Facilities =

American scientific organization

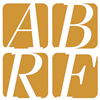
- Formation: 1989
- Headquarters: Lexington, KY
- Location: United States
- Members: 2500 (May 2023)
- Official language: English
- President: Kevin Knudtson
- Website: http://www.abrf.org/

The Association of Biomolecular Resource Facilities (ABRF) is dedicated to advancing core and research biotechnology laboratories through research, communication, and education. ABRF members include over 2000 scientists representing 340 different core laboratories in 41 countries, including those in industry, government, academic and research institutions.

== History ==
In 1986 a Research Resource Facility Satellite Meeting was held in conjunction with the Sixth International Conference on Methods in Protein Sequence Analysis. The next year protein sequencing and amino acid samples were sent to survey 103 core facilities. By 1989 the ABRF was formally organized and incorporated. Each year an annual meeting was held as a satellite meeting of the Protein Society until 1996 when separate meetings began.

== ABRF Research Groups ==
Research Groups are established to fulfill two of the purposes of the Association of Biomolecular Resource Facilities. First, to provide mechanisms for the self-evaluation and improvement of procedural and operational accuracy, precision and efficiency in resource facilities and research laboratories. Second, to contribute to the education of resource facility and research laboratory staff, users, administrators, and interested members of the scientific community. The results of ABRF Research Group studies have been published in scientific papers. Results from ABRF Research Group studies have seen reuse in other research.

- ABRF Next Generation Sequencing Group (ABRF-NGS)
- Antibody Technology Research Group (ARG)
- Biomedical 'Omics Research Group (BORG)
- DNA Sequencing Research Group (DSRG)
- Flow Cytometry Research Group (FCRG)
- Genomics Research Group (GVRG)
- Glycoprotein Research Group (gPRG)
- Light Microscopy Research Group (LMRG)
- Metabolomics Research Group (MRG)
- Metagenomics Research Group (MGRG)
- Molecular Interactions Research Group (MIRG)
- Nucleic Acids Research Group (NARG)
- Protein Expression Research Group (PERG)
- Protein Sequencing Research Group (PSRG)
- Proteomics Research Group (PRG)
- Proteome Informatics Research Group (iPRG)
- Proteomics Standards Research Group (sPRG)

== Resource Technologies ==
Members of ABRF are involved in a broad spectrum of biomolecular technologies that are implemented in core facility settings:

- Automation: high throughput screening, LIMS, robotics.
- Protein/Peptide Chemistry: amino acid analysis, N- and C-terminal sequencing, peptide synthesis, peptide/protein arrays.
- Biophysics: calorimetry, CD, fluorescence, light scattering, SPR, ultracentrifugation.
- Flow Cytometry Fluorescence Activating Cell Sorting
- Protein Expression, Identification, and Profiling: differential fluorescence, conventional 2-D gel electrophoresis, disease biomarker discovery.
- Gene Expression and Profiling: gene arrays, real-time PCR.
- Mass Spectrometry: qualitative, quantitative, and structural analysis of proteins, carbohydrates, oligonucleotides, and lipids.
- Microscopy light microscopy and imaging, Confocal Microscopy
- Nucleic Acid Chemistry: DNA sequencing, DNA synthesis, RNA synthesis, genotyping.
- Separations: 1- and 2-D PAGE, capillary electrophoresis, chromatography.
- Quality Control: GLP, GMP, quality and compliance.
- Universal Proteomics Standard (UPS), a mixture of proteins used as reference standard in proteomics, introduced by the above-mentioned sPRG. This includes two sets: the original (UPS1, where all 48 proteins are at 48 pmol), and a dynamic range of concentrations (called UPS2), ranging from 500 amol to 50 pmol.
- Other: bioinformatics, carbohydrate analysis, differential display, recombinant protein production.

== Annual Conference ==
Every year the Association of Biomolecular Resource Facilities annual conference is held during the spring in a varying North American city. This international conference is used to expose members to new and emerging biotechnology through lectures, roundtables, Research Group presentations, poster sessions, workshops and technical exhibits.

- ABRF 2025, 23–28 March 2025, Las Vegas, NV
- ABRF 2024, 21–24 April 2024, Minneapolis, MN
- ABRF 2023, 7–10 May 2023, Boston, MA
- ABRF 2022, 27–30 March 2022, Palm Springs, CA
- ABRF 2021, 7–11 March 2021, virtual meeting due to COVID-19
- ABRF 2020, 29 February – 3 March 2020, Palm Springs, CA
- ABRF 2019, 23–26 March, San Antonio, Texas; 30 Years of Challenging the Limits of Science and Technology, Opening Doors for the Future
- ABRF 2018, 22–25 April, Myrtle Beach, South Carolina; The Premier Conference for Core Services
- ABRF 2017, 25–28 March, San Diego, California; A Forum for Advancing Today's Core Technologies to Enable Tomorrow's Innovations
- ABRF 2016, 20–23 February, Ft. Lauderdale, Florida; Innovative Technologies Accelerating Discovery
- ABRF 2015, 28–31 March, St. Louis, Missouri; Integrative Technologies for Advancing Scientific Cores
- ABRF 2014, 23–25 March, Albuquerque, New Mexico; Team Science and Big Data: Cores at the Frontier
- ABRF 2013, 2–5 March, Palm Springs, California; Tools for the Advancement of Convergence Science
- ABRF 2012, 17–20 March, Orlando, Florida; Learning From Biomolecules
- ABRF 2011, 19–22 February, San Antonio, Texas; Technologies to Enable Personalized Medicine
- ABRF 2010, 20–23 March, Sacramento, California; Translating Basic Research With Advances in Biomolecular Technology
- ABRF 2009, 7–10 February, Memphis, Tennessee; Application and Optimization of Existing and Emerging Biotechnologies
- ABRF 2008, 9–12 February, Salt Lake City, Utah; Enabling Technologies in the Life Sciences
- ABRF 2007, 31 March- 3 April, Tampa, Florida; Creating the Biological Roadmap
- ABRF 2006, 11–14 February, Long Beach, California; Integrating Science, Tools and Technologies with Systems Biology
- ABRF 2005, 5–8 February, Savannah, Georgia; BioMolecular Technologies: Discovery to Hypothesis
- ABRF 2004, 28 February – 2 March, Portland, Oregon; Integrating Technologies in Proteomics and Genomics
- ABRF 2003, 10–13 February, Denver, Colorado; Translating Biology Using Proteomics and Functional Genomics
- ABRF 2002, 9–12 March, Austin, Texas; Biomolecular Technologies: Tools for Discovery in Proteomics and Genomics
- ABRF 2001, 24–27 February, San Diego, CA; The New Biology: Technology for resolving Macromolecular Communications
- ABRF 2000, 19–22 February, Bellevue, Washington; From Singular to Global Analyses of Biological Systems
- ABRF 1999, 19–22 March, Durham, North Carolina; Bioinformatics and Biomolecular Technologies: Linking Genomes, Proteomes and Biochemistry
- ABRF 1998, 21–24 March, San Diego, California; From Genomes to Function – Technical Challenges of the Post-Genome Era
- ABRF 1997, 9–12 February, Baltimore, Maryland; Techniques at the Genome-Proteome Interface
- ABRF 1996, 30 March – 2 April, San Francisco, California; Biomolecular Techniques

== ABRF Award ==
The ABRF Award is presented at the annual ABRF meeting for outstanding contributions to Biomolecular Technologies. Past Award Winners (the years refer to the annual conference at which the award was presented):

- 2023 Christie G. Enke and Richard Yost for their development of the triple quadrupole mass spectrometer and the tremendous impact triple quads have made for a wide range of biomedical research applications.
- 2022 Jennifer Lippincott-Schwartz
- 2020 George Church for his groundbreaking research in genomic sequencing and his leadership in the fields of gene therapy and synthetic biology technologies.
- 2019 Richard M. Caprioli for the discovery of temporal and spatial processing in biological systems using mass spectrometry.
- 2018 Amos Bairoch for the development of community resources such as UniProtKB/Swiss-Prot knowledgebase, PROSITE, ENZYME, and neXtProt.
- 2017 Sir Shankar Balasubramanian and David Klenerman for the invention of a method of next-generation DNA sequencing which is commonly known today as "sequencing by synthesis".
- 2016 Emmanuelle Charpentier and Jennifer Doudna for the development of CRISPR/Cas9 Genome Editing Technologies.
- 2015 John G. White and William Bradshaw Amos for the development of high-resolution, laser scanning confocal microscope
- 2014 Patrick H. O'Farrell, for the development of 2-dimensional gel electrophoresis.
- 2013 Leonard Herzenberg and Leonore Herzenberg for the development of Flow Activated Cell Sorting (FACS).
- 2012 Alan G. Marshall for the development of Fourier Transform Ion Cyclotron Resonance (FT-ICR) Mass Spectrometry.
- 2011 Sir Alec John Jeffreys: Developed techniques for DNA fingerprinting and DNA profiling
- 2010 Pat Brown: Pioneering work in the development of microarrays, and the diverse applications of this technology in genetic research.
- 2009 Mathias Uhlén
- 2008 Ruedi Aebersold
- 2007 Donald F. Hunt
- 2006 Roger Tsien
- 2005 Stephen Fodor
- 2004 Edwin Southern
- 2003 Franz Hillenkamp and Michael Karas
- 2002 John Fenn
- 2001 Csaba Horvath
- 2000 Leroy Hood
- 1999 Marvin H. Caruthers for pioneering contributions to the chemical synthesis of DNA and RNA
- 1998 Bruce Merrifield
- 1997 Lloyd M. Smith
- 1996 David Lipman
- 1995 Klaus Biemann
- 1994 Frederick Sanger

== Journal of Biomolecular Techniques ==
The ABRF is the publisher of the Journal of Biomolecular Techniques. The journal is peer-reviewed and is published quarterly. The major focus of the journal is to publish scientific reviews and articles related to biomolecular resource facilities. The Research Group published reports include annual surveys. News and events, as well as an article watch focused on techniques used in typical core facility environments are also included. The current Editor-in-Chief is Ron Orlando, University of Georgia.

== ABRF Executive Board ==
- Kevin Knudtson, ABRF President, Genomics Division, University of Iowa
- Justine Kigenyi, Treasurer, KU Medical Center
- Marie Adams, Van Andel Institute
- Roxann Ashworth, Johns Hopkins University
- Kym Delventhal, Stowers Institute for Medical Research
- Sridar Chittur, SUNY Albany
- Nick Ambulos, University of Maryland School of Medicine
- Sue Weintraub, University of Texas Health Science Center at San Antonio
- Magnus Palmblad, Leiden University Medical Center
- Ken Schoppmann, ABRF Executive Director
