= Robert E. Finnigan =

American electrical engineer (1927–2022)

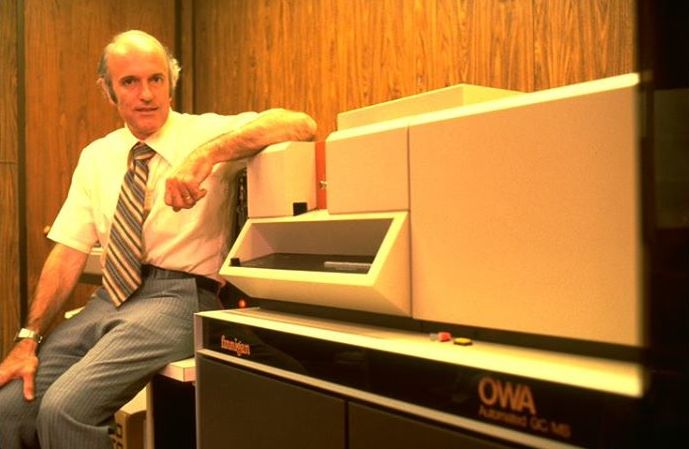
- Finnigan with Model 1020 GCMS/Data System, 1983
- Born: Robert Emmet Finnigan; May 27, 1927; Buffalo, New York, U.S.
- Died: August 14, 2022 (aged 95); Palo Alto, California, U.S.
- Education: University of Illinois, U.S. Naval Academy (Class of 1949)
- Spouse: Bette Van Horn (m. 1950)
- Scientific career
- Fields: Gas chromatography–mass spectrometry
- Workplaces: United States Air Force, Electronic Associates, Finnigan Instrument Corporation
- Doctoral advisor: Gilbert Fett

External videos
- "Robert Finnigan -- Computerized GC/MS and Environmental Chemistry", Legends of Environmental Chemistry, 2008

Robert Emmet Finnigan (May 27, 1927 – August 14, 2022) was an American pioneer in the development of gas chromatography–mass spectrometry equipment (GC/MS). Finnigan founded the Scientific Instruments Division of Electronic Associates, Inc., producing the first commercial quadrupole mass spectrometer in 1964. He then formed Finnigan Instruments Corporation to combine a computer system with a quadrupole mass spectrometer and gas chromatograph. Finnigan's GC/MS/computer systems are used to detect and identify trace organic compounds, making them important instruments for the monitoring and protection of the environment. They were adopted by the United States Environmental Protection Agency as a standard instrument for monitoring water quality and were fundamental to the work of the EPA.

== Early life and education ==
Robert Finnigan was born on May 27, 1927, in Buffalo, New York, to Charles M. and Marie F. Finnigan. He was one of seven children, who were raised primarily by their father after their mother's early death.

Finnigan entered the United States Naval Academy in Annapolis, Maryland, in June 1945, graduating in 1949 with a Bachelor of Science. On April 1, 1950, he married Bette Earl Van Horn at Perrin Air Force Base in Sherman, Texas. The couple had met while he was at Tyndall Air Force Base near Panama City, Florida.

Because of his strong interest and aptitude in electrical engineering, he was able to enroll in an Air Force Institute of Technology program that sent qualified officers to graduate school. In 1952, he entered the University of Illinois at Urbana–Champaign, receiving an M.S. in electrical engineering in 1954 and a Ph.D. in electrical engineering in 1957. His master's thesis work with Edward C. Jordan used the ILLIAC to solve complex mathematical functions in antenna theory. For his Ph.D. he researched servomechanism theory with Gilbert Fett, completing the thesis Transient Analysis of Non-Linear Servomechanisms Using Describing Functions with Root-Locus Techniques.

== Lawrence Livermore Laboratory ==
In 1957, as a captain in the United States Air Force, Robert Finnigan joined the University of California Radiation Laboratory at Livermore (later the Lawrence Livermore National Laboratory). Finnigan worked on Project Pluto, a United States government program to develop nuclear powered ramjet engines for the Supersonic Low Altitude Missile (SLAM), a type of cruise missile. Finnigan led the group that developed computer control systems for the nuclear reactor that powered the missile.

In 1959, Finnigan had the choice of rotating to a different tour of duty in the Air Force, or resigning from the Air Force and staying at Livermore. He remained at Livermore for two more years. Finnigan's group developed the Tory II-A prototype and Tory II-C reactor and controls, which were tested at the Nevada Test Site in the 1960s.

== Stanford Research Institute ==
In 1962, Finnigan and one of his coworkers, physicist and nuclear engineer P. Michael Uthe Jr., left Livermore to work for the Stanford Research Institute (SRI) in Palo Alto, California. Finnigan was hired to establish a process controls group in SRI's control systems lab. SRI did contract research projects for both business and the military. One of the projects underway at SRI, led by Kenneth R. Shoulders, was developing a quadrupole mass spectrometer. Finnigan saw the potential for using the quadrupole broadly as a detector for instrumentation and process-control, and began trying to find support for its development and commercialization.

== Electronic Associates, Inc. ==
In 1963, Finnigan and Uthe joined Electronic Associates, Inc. (EAI). The main research department of the company was based in Princeton, New Jersey, but Finnigan founded a new Scientific Instruments Division in Palo Alto, California. Finnigan's vision involved creation of a broad-based line of process-control instruments, beginning with the quadrupole mass spectrometer. Based on previous research at SRI, Finnigan was convinced that a market existed, but EAI and other companies such as IBM and Beckman Instruments were not interested in developing the quadrupole as a product at that time. Finnigan's group proposed to contract parts of the quadrupole production to SRI, but management at SRI were not interested in its commercial development either. Eventually Finnigan collaborated with staff from SRI, who supplied knowledge and expertise to help Finnigan's group bootstrap development of a prototype quadrupole analyzer at EAI. Because of the strong market demand the EAI division was able to sell more than 500 of these quadrupole residual gas analyzers between 1964 and 1966.

Finnigan wanted to pursue development of computer-controlled instrumentation for a combined gas chromatograph (GC) and quadrupole mass spectrometer (MS). However, EAI's main focus was analog computers, and they were not interested in developing a computerized GC/MS. On December 31, 1966, after EAI unsuccessfully attempted to sell the division to Syntex Corporation, Finnigan submitted his resignation to EAI.

== Finnigan Instrument Corporation ==
In 1967, Finnigan formed Finnigan Instrument Corporation with venture capital from Roger Sant and T. Z. Chu. He was joined by Michael Story from EAI, and William Fies from SRI.

In early 1968, Finnigan Instrument Corporation delivered its first prototype quadrupole GC/MS instruments. One was sent to Nobel Prize winner Joshua Lederberg at Stanford University. The other was sent to Purdue University. The first commercial model for a computerized GC/MS, Finnigan's Model 1015/System 150, was introduced soon after for a price of $100,000. The first delivery went to Evan Charles Horning and Marjorie G. Horning at Baylor Medical College. For three years, Finnigan was the only company producing a computerized GC/MS. The next one to be introduced came from the Hewlett-Packard Company in 1971.

Quadrupole mass spectrometry offered advantages in terms of size, cost, speed and sensitivity compared to the magnetic-sector mass spectrometry equipment most commonly used at that time. Quadrupoles offered high sensitivity and high-pressure tolerance. They could operate with a low voltage ion source. Rapid scanning became feasible because computers could be used to step the spectrometer from one ion peak to the next. This allowed acquisition and display of data in real-time, and gave operators the potential to interact with the system and modify what was being monitored. A major strength of the instrument was precise quantitation. It could be used to detect trace contaminants in environmental samples, to identify drugs in a case of overdose, and to measure drug metabolites.

After the United States Environmental Protection Agency (EPA) was established in 1970, it became a major customer for Finnigan's GC/MS. The EPA surveyed possible monitoring instruments for use in monitoring organic pollutants. Speed, cost, and performance were all important concerns. The target machine was projected as having the ability to scan for pesticides with a resolving power of 1,000 to 10,000, across a broad range of 10 nanograms to one microgram. A computer-controlled system was desirable. An international array of instruments were reviewed, of which only two used quadrupole technology. An expert panel recommended Finnigan's quadrupole GC/MS to the EPA for further evaluation, and twenty Finnigan Model 1015/System 150 instruments were ordered soon after by the EPA. Finnigan published a 1979 study, based on users, indicating that in spite of the high initial cost of the equipment, the Finnigan GC/MS was reliable and cost-effective. By 1979, the Finnigan GC/MS was the preferred instrument at the EPA for the analysis of environmental pollutants in water and wastewater. The models most generally used were Finnigan Corporation's 1015 and 3000 series of quadrupole mass spectrometers with a data system based on DEC's PDP-8 computers. The EPA also based its instruction manuals and standards for environmental testing on the Finnigan GC/MS, publishing the results in the Federal Register in 1979. By 1984, all public water was to be tested by using a GC/MS apparatus. In the 1980s, an estimated 60-70% of Finnigan's GC/MS sales went to the environmental market.

GC/MS technology, of which Finnigan Instrument Corporation's instrument was the first, was the technical underpinning that made it possible for the EPA to carry out its regulatory efforts in the 1970s. About 100 organic compounds could be identified in water prior to 1970. By 1975, nearly 1500 organic pollutants had been identified. Without the ability to detect such compounds, their monitoring and regulation would not have been possible.

In 1981, Finnigan purchased the MAT division from Varian Associates which produced mass spectrometers in Bremen, Germany forming the Finnigan MAT brand of MS instruments. When Finnigan Instrument Corporation was acquired by Thermo Instrument Systems (since 2006 Thermo Fisher Scientific) in 1990, the firm was considered "the world's leading manufacturer of mass spectrometers". Robert Finnigan continued to consult for the company for several years after the acquisition. He has also consulted with other entrepreneurial companies.

== Other activities ==
Robert Finnigan served on the board of directors of the trade organization American Electronics Association (AEA). He and Dean O. Morton were founders of the AEA's Environmental and Occupational Health activities. Finnigan also co-founded the Organization Internationale Metrology Legale (OIML) for legal metrology. With the support of the National Bureau of Standards (NBS) they developed protocols for international regulations in fifty-one nations. In many cases, these closely matched the standards of the EPA.

== Death ==
Finnigan died on August 14, 2022, at his house in Los Altos, California, at the age of 95.

== Awards and honors ==
- 2017, "From Discovery to Precision Medicine: Mass Spectrometry Through the Years and Beyond" at Pittcon 2017, a session focused on the contributions of Robert E. Finnigan
- 2008, Selected for "Legends of Environmental Chemistry" by American Chemical Society, ACS annual meeting, New York
- 1999, Instrumentation Hall of Fame (Charter Member) by Pittcon, American Chemical Society and Chemical Heritage Foundation
- 1994, Selected as a Pioneer in Development of Analytical Instrumentation by Pittsburgh Conference (Pittcon) and American Chemical Society
- 1980, Distinguished Service in Engineering, College of Engineering, University of Illinois
- 1975, Distinguished Alumni Award, Electrical and Computer Engineering Department, University of Illinois
