= Core facility =

Scientific research resource

A core facility (also known as core laboratory or simply "core", like in "flow cytometry core", occasionally technological platform) is a centralized shared research resource that provides scientific community with access to unique and highly specialized instruments, technologies, services, and experts. Cores are frequently built around a specific technology or instrumentation, but not always (for example, biostatistics cores offer services of experts skilled in the use of software packages). A database of US core facilities is maintained by the Association of Biomolecular Resource Facilities.

By the late 20th century, the researchers in the life sciences were increasingly dependent on the use of expensive and complex instruments and techniques that cannot be economically replicated inside each laboratory. In many areas (for example, in translational science) access to core laboratories became essential. Once the research institutions recognized the potential cost savings of provisioning state-of-the-art instrumentation and services in a centralized way, multiple shared facilities were established, prompting discussions about the best ways to administer and finance them.

The high-value and difficult-to-operate equipment typically used in a core setting in the beginning of the 21st century included NMR spectrometers, mass spectrometers, Raman spectrometers and microscopes, transmission and Auger electron microscopes, X-ray diffraction spectrometers, lithographic equipment, and X-ray and Auger photoelectron spectrometers.

The financial arrangements for the cores at different institutions vary. A core might recover its costs through user fees charged to the researcher's ("investigator's") funds as direct cost, frequently based on research grants. In this sense, such core operates as a small business. However, an institution might decide that the centralized facility shall be funded through facilities and administration (F&A) indirect costs (IDC). The second option is convenient, as the institution's administration retains full control, and, since the true facility costs are offset through the IDC, the direct costs to the researchers can be decreased, thus attracting investigators from outside the institution as well and lowering the institution's overall financial burden of maintaining a core facility. As a result, in the United States, the IDC for government grants in the 2020s were occasionally as high as 95% of the amount, with the average rate of 30%, and 60% not uncommon.

In February 2025, as a part of the cost-cutting by the Trump administration, the IDC were capped at 15% for the NIH grants, thus creating a financial problem for the core facilities.

== Sources ==
- Badger, Emily; Bhatia, Aatish; Cabreros, Irineo; Murray, Eli; Paris, Francesca; Sanger-Katz, Margot; Singer, Ethan (2025-02-14). "How Trump's Medical Research Cuts Would Hit Colleges and Hospitals in Every State". The New York Times.
- Farber, Gregory K.; Weiss, Linda (2011-08-10). "Core Facilities: Maximizing the Return on Investment". Science Translational Medicine. 3 (95): 95cm21. doi:10.1126/scitranslmed.3002421. ISSN 1946-6234. PMC 3161425. PMID 21832235.
- Halpert, Madeline (2025-02-09). "Trump administration to cut billions from biomedical research funding". BBC.
- Hockberger, Philip; Meyn, Susan; Nicklin, Connie; Tabarini, Diane; Turpen, Paula; Auger, Julie (2013). "Best Practices for Core Facilities: Handling External Customers". Journal of Biomolecular Techniques. 24 (2): jbt.13–2402–001. doi:10.7171/jbt.13-2402-001. ISSN 1524-0215. PMC 3605920. PMID 23814500.
- Lejeune, Laurence; Davis, Kim G.F.; Larivière, Vincent; Renaud-Desjardins, Louis; Waldispühl, Jérôme; Brown, Claire M. (2020). "Impact of Scientific Platforms on Research Success" (PDF). Canadian Network of Scientific Platforms.
- Murray, Royce (2009-11-01). "Shared Experimental Infrastructures". Analytical Chemistry. 81 (21): 8655. doi:10.1021/ac902246e. ISSN 0003-2700. PMID 19821591.
- National Institute of Health (2013-04-08). "FAQs for Costing of NIH-Funded Core Facilities". Grants & Funding.
- Ribeiro Oliveira, André Browne; Santos Ramos, Marcelo; Dias Vinhas, Roni; Vasconcellos Ferreira, Cristiano; Damasceno Pinto, Claudio; Souza Machado, Bruna Aparecida (2025-05-23). "Factors Limiting the Management of Technological Platforms ("Core Facility") to Support Scientific Health Research". Journal of Bioengineering, Technologies and Health. 8 (2): 210–216. doi:10.34178/jbth.v8i2.490. ISSN 2764-622X.
- Turpen, Paula B.; Hockberger, Philip E.; Meyn, Susan M.; Nicklin, Connie; Tabarini, Diane; Auger, Julie A. (2016). "Metrics for Success: Strategies for Enabling Core Facility Performance and Assessing Outcomes". Journal of Biomolecular Techniques. 27 (1): 25–39. doi:10.7171/jbt.16-2701-001. ISSN 1524-0215. PMC 4736753. PMID 26848284.
