= MassLynx =

- Developer: Waters Corporation
- Stable release: 4.2
- Operating system: Windows
- Type: Mass spectrometry software
- License: Proprietary
- Website: MassLynx on Waters website

MassLynx is a software package to control analytical equipment produced by Waters Corporation. It was developed to simplify interaction with mass spectrometry equipment.

It is used to control equipment including liquid chromatography systems such as the ACQUITY UPLC series of UHPLC systems and mass spectrometers such as the Xevo TQ-S.

MassLynx is used for hardware control, creating, editing and executing run sequences as well as configuration of acquisition methods. Data treatment is performed in other software such as TargetLynx or ChromaLynx.
