= Lloyd M. Smith =

American chemistry academic

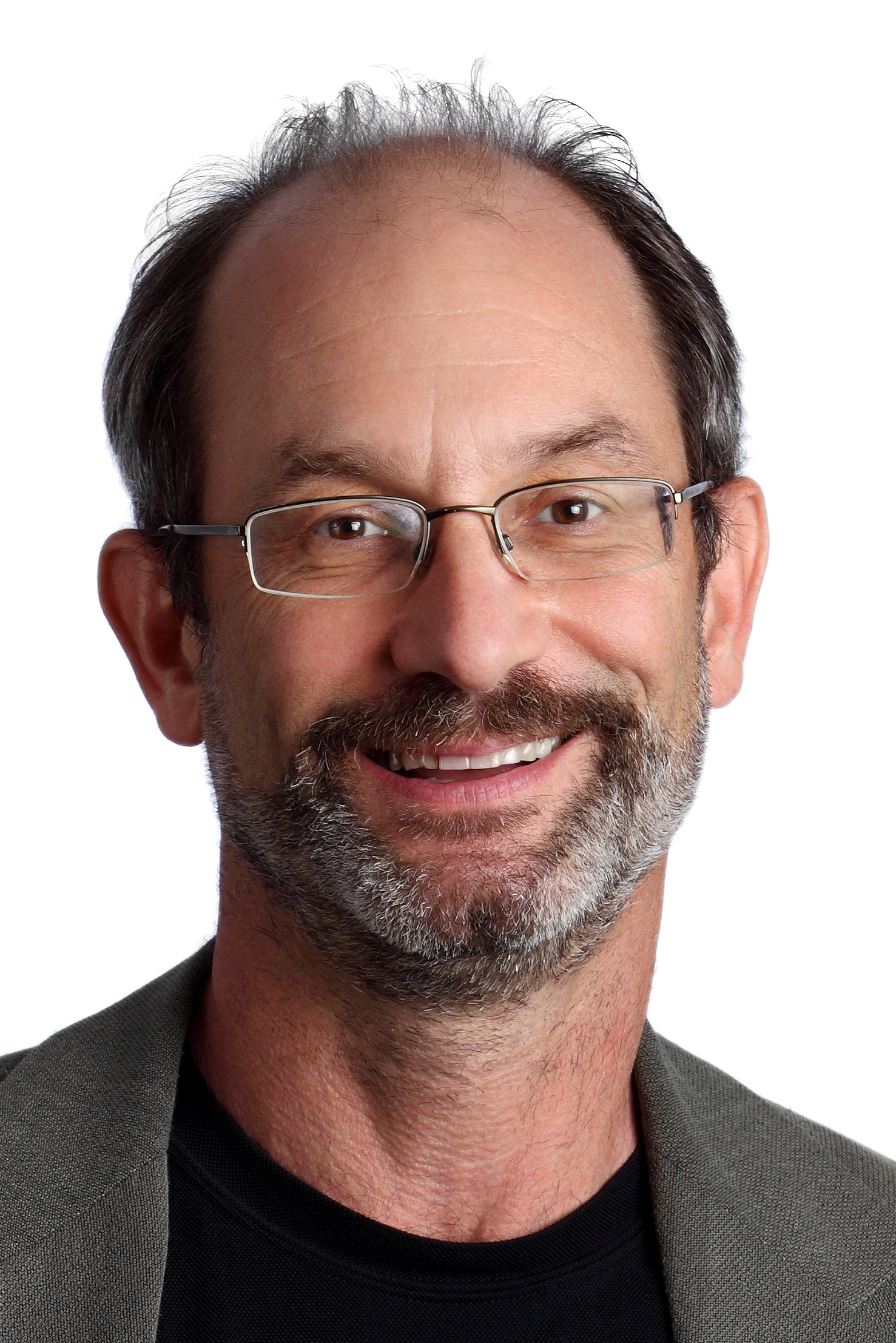
- Lloyd M. Smith
- Born: October 3, 1954 (age 71)
- Citizenship: American
- Education: University of California, Berkeley
- Known for: DNA sequencing
- Scientific career
- Fields: Biochemistry
- Workplaces: University of Wisconsin-Madison
- Doctoral advisor: Harden M. McConnell

Lloyd M. Smith (born October 3, 1954) is an American professor of chemistry and the founder of Third Wave Technologies.

== Early life ==
Smith spent his formative years in Berkeley, California, where his parents worked as professors of physics and mathematics. He majored in biochemistry at the University of California in 1976, performing research with Wayne Hubbell, and subsequently obtained his PhD from Stanford University for his work on membrane diffusion with Harden M. McConnell.

== Career ==
In 1982, Smith did post-doctorate work with Leroy Hood at the California Institute of Technology, where he created the world's first fluorescence-based automated DNA sequencing instrument. During the early 80s he also worked as a consultant for Applied Biosystems, who were able to commercialise the sequencing process he developed and bring it to market. This sequencing process was to have a direct effect on the development of the Human Genome Project.

In 1987, Smith joined the University of Wisconsin–Madison as an assistant professor; he subsequently held posts there as chair of the analytical sciences division and director of the university's Genome Center. He has held posts on the boards of Visible Genetics, GWC Technologies, and founded Third Wave Technologies and Gentel BioSciences.

== Academic research and publications ==
Smith has authored or co-authored over 250 papers. He holds over 30 U.S. patents for his inventions in the field of biochemistry. He held the John D. MacArthur Chair in Chemistry at Wisconsin-Madison, and is currently the W. L. Hubbell Professor of Chemistry there.

He was listed as one of the Top 100 Innovators by Science Digest, has won a Presidential Young Investigator Award, and has received an Eli Lilly Analytical Chemistry Award. Because of his work on automated DNA sequencing Smith was awarded the Association of Biomolecular Resource Facilities Award in 1997.
