= Everard Mott Williams =

American academic and electrical engineer (1915–1972)

Everard Mott Williams (February 2, 1915 – October 24, 1972), noted scientist and educator, was born in New Haven, Connecticut. He was the son of Cecil Hayward Williams (1886-1972) of Detroit, Michigan and Phyllis Hope Hason (1886-1973) of London, England. His paternal grandfather was Rev. Gershom Mott Williams, paternal great-grandfather was General Thomas Williams, and his paternal 2nd great-grandfather was John Biddle, making him a part of the Biddle family.

He received a Ph.D. from Yale University in Electrical Engineering in 1939, served as the head of Carnegie Mellon University, Department of Electrical Engineering from 1952–1969 and has over 100 patents.

The broad scope of his accomplishments includes invention, engineering consulting, teaching methodology, and academic administration. Williams pioneered in programmed instruction and teaching machines, innovated electric discharge machining and contributed to electronic countermeasures.

Williams started his teaching career at Penn State in 1939, but with the declaration of war in 1942, became associated with the development branch special projects laboratory at Wright Field as a Chief Branch Engineer. There he was concerned with work on radar, development of radio countermeasures, radio control for guided missiles, and infra red systems. He became an associate professor at Carnegie Mellon University in 1945 and became head of the Electrical Engineering department in 1952.

== Accomplishments ==
- Recipient of a 1938 General Electric Charles A. Coffin fellowship totalling $5,000 for advanced study and research. The fellowship was used to investigate the properties of short-wave transmitting antennas.
- Eta Kappa Nu recognition award - 1946.
- George Westinghouse professor of the Carnegie Mellon University.
- Member Sigma Xi, Tau Beta Pi, The American Association of University Professors, The American Society of Engineering Education.
- 1952 awarded a $12,600 research grant by the National Science Foundation to support research in the field of Phenomena Accompanying Transient Low Voltage Sparkover in Liquid Dielectrics.
- Pittsburgh Man of the Year in 1959.
- Most Outstanding Young Electrical Engineer in the United States in 1946. The award by the Eta Kappa Nu, national electrical engineering fraternity, goes to persons under 35, and out of college 10 years, who have performed "meritorious service in the interest of mankind.".
- Cited by the President of the United States for "Outstanding fidelity and meritorious conduct in the aid of the war effort" in World War II. Awarded the President's Certificate of merit for World War II work on radar, guided missiles and infrared systems at Wright field in Dayton, Ohio.
- 1971 Western Electric Award for excellent instruction of engineering students.
- Designed the oscillator and deflector for the $2,500,000 synchro-cyclotron at Carnegie Tech.
- Developed a radar device during World War II which was used on US missiles from 1944 through 1960, which increased accuracy of directing the missile to its target.
- Consultant to Firth Sterling, Carbide corp, U.S. Army Ordnance Dept.
- Member of the board of directors of Electronic Associates.
- Served on NASA's research advisory committee on communications and data processing.
- Holds more than 100 patents in radar, guided missiles, photographic equipment, machine tools, electronic organs, and radio receivers, transmitters and jamming devices.
