= Electronic Associates =

Electronic Associates, Inc. (EAI)
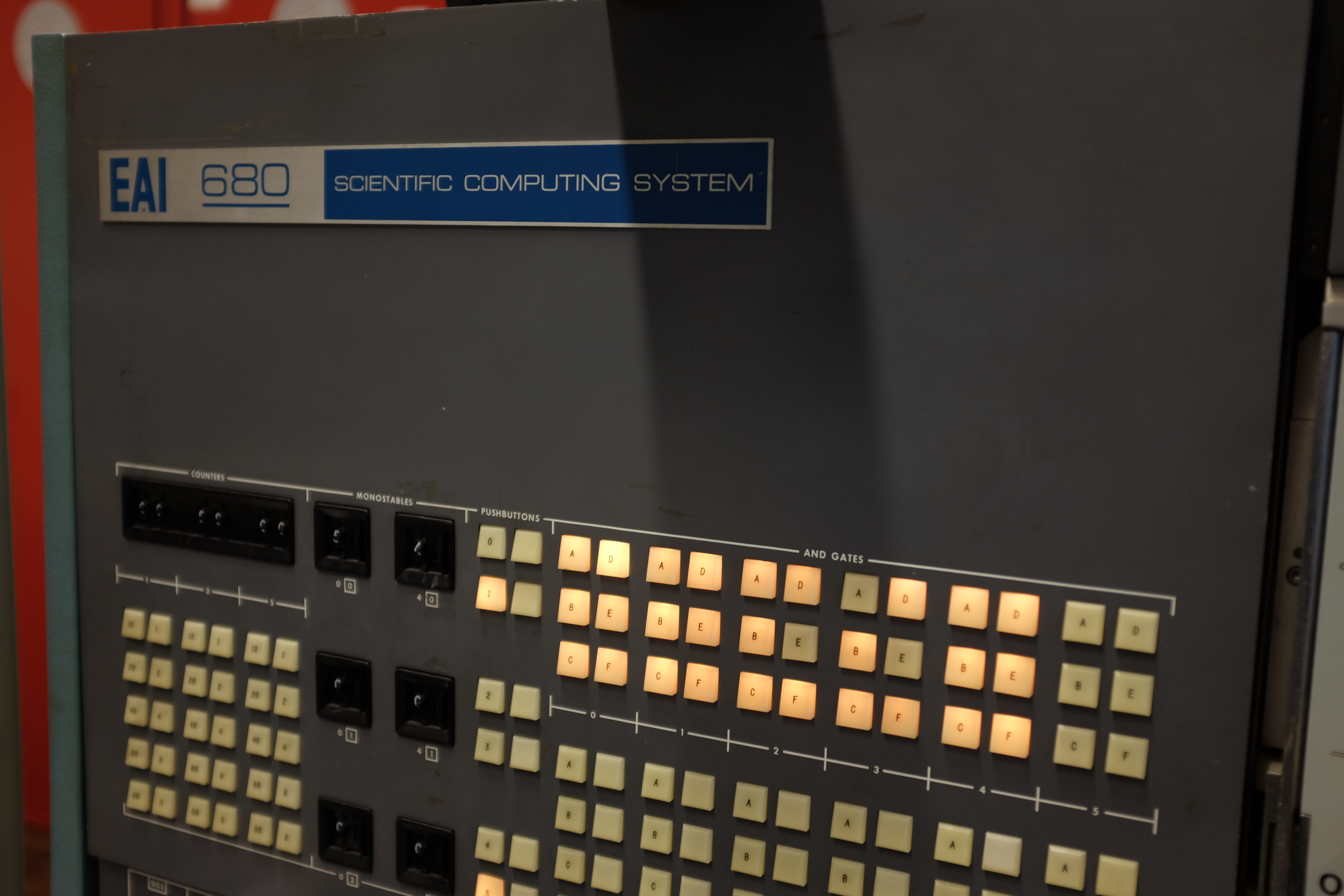
- Industry: Computer
- Founded: 1945
- Headquarters: West Long Branch, New Jersey 185 Monmouth Parkway (before Bell Labs)
- Products: Analog computers

Electronic Associates, Inc. (EAI) was founded in 1945 by Lloyd F. Christianson and Arthur L. Adamson and began manufacturing analog computers in 1952. Their systems were used by NASA to develop space probes and simulate physical systems. As digital technology matured, they began production of both hybrid digital/analog systems, such as the EAI680 with 156 amplifiers, diode function generators and servo-controlled potentiometers to control input parameters, and digital computers such as the EAI 640.

Under the direction of Robert E. Finnigan, the company developed the first quadrupole gas chromatography–mass spectrometry devices and sold over 500 devices between 1965 and 1966, which accounted for most of the firm's profit.

Other notable employees include Hans Witsenhausen and board member Everard Mott Williams.

In 1963, the company acquired Pacific Data Systems (PDS) from Mesa Scientific Corporation of Inglewood, California. PDS continued to operate as a subsidiary of EAI for several years, manufacturing general-purpose minicomputers built into desks.
