= Analytical thermal desorption =

Chemical analysis technique

Analytical thermal desorption, known within the analytical chemistry community simply as "thermal desorption" (TD), is a technique that concentrates volatile organic compounds (VOCs) in gas streams prior to injection into a gas chromatograph (GC). It can be used to lower the detection limits of GC methods, and can improve chromatographic performance by reducing peak widths.

== History ==
Analytical thermal desorption originated in the mid-1970s as an adaptation to the injection procedure for GC. Injector liners were packed with a compound able to adsorb organic compounds, used to sample air or gas, and then dropped into the inlet of the GC. This principle was first widely employed for occupational monitoring, in the form of personal badge-type monitors containing a removable charcoal strip. These offered the advantage of being amenable to analysis without a separate solvent-extraction step.

Also developed in the 1970s was a method by which volatiles in the air were collected by diffusion onto tubes packed with a sorbent, which was then heated to release the volatiles into the GC system. These were first introduced for monitoring sulfur dioxide and nitrogen dioxide, but the analyte scope later widened as the sorbents became more advanced. Another early method (closely related to the modern purge-and-trap procedure) involved passing a stream of gas through a water sample to release the volatiles, which were again collected on a sorbent-packed tube.

Such axial-type samplers, which later became known as 'sorbent tubes', were laid out as an industry standard in the late 1970s, by Working Group 5 (WG5) of the UK Health & Safety's Committee on Analytical Requirements (HSE CAR). The tubes they outlined were 3 1/2 inches long with an outer diameter of 1/4 inch, and were first employed in Perkin Elmer's ATD-50 instrument.

At the same time, WG5 specified various basic functionality requirements for thermal desorption, and in the years since then, a number of improvements have been made to instrumentation for thermal desorption, including two-stage operation (see below), splitting and re-collection of samples, improved trap-cooling technology, standard system checks, and automation.

== Principles ==
Thermal desorption fundamentally involves collecting volatile organic compounds onto a sorbent, and then heating this sorbent in a flow of gas to release the compounds and concentrate them into a smaller volume.

Early thermal desorbers used just single-stage operation, whereby the volatiles collected on a sorbent tube were released by heating the tube in a flow of gas, from where they passed directly into the GC.

Modern thermal desorbers can also accommodate two-stage operation, whereby the gas stream from the sorbent tube (typically 100–200 mL) is collected on a narrower tube integral to the thermal desorber, called the focusing trap or cold trap. Heating this trap releases the analytes once again, but this time in an even smaller volume of gas (typically 100–200 μL), resulting in improved sensitivity and better GC peak shape.

Modern thermal desorbers can accommodate both single-stage and two-stage operation, although single-stage operation is now usually carried out using the focusing trap to collect the analytes, rather than a sorbent tube.

It is normal for the focusing trap to be held at or below room temperature, although a temperature no lower than 0 °C is sufficient for all but the most volatile analytes. Higher trap temperatures also reduce the amount of water condensing inside the trap (when transferred to the GC column, water can reduce the quality of the chromatography).

== Sampling configurations ==
A wide variety of sampling configurations are used for thermal desorption, depending on the application. The most popular are listed below.

=== Single-stage thermal desorption ===
This involves sampling direct onto the focusing trap of the thermal desorber. It is generally used for situations where the analytes are too volatile to be retained on sorbent tubes.

- Bags – Commonly known as 'Tedlar bags', these are made from poly(vinyl fluoride) film.
- Canisters – These are available in a range of sizes up to 1 L, and are popular especially in the US and Japan for monitoring of air for compounds lighter than about n-dodecane (n-C_{12}H_{26}). The canister is evacuated and allowed to refill with the target atmosphere via a flow regulator.
- Headspace – The material is placed in a headspace vial or other sampling container, and the headspace introduced directly into the focusing trap. Multiple samplings onto the same trap allow sensitivity to be increased, but it is increasingly common for two-stage thermal desorption to be used instead.
- On-line – The target atmosphere is simply pumped directly onto the focusing trap.
- Purge-and-trap – A flow of gas is bubbled through an aqueous sample (a beverage or aqueous extract), and the gas stream then introduced directly into the focusing trap.
- Solid-phase microextraction – This is based on adsorption of analytes onto a polymer-coated fibre or cartridge. The small sample size taken onto fibres means that analytes are usually desorbed directly into the GC, while the larger cartridges are usually placed in a TD tube and subjected to single-stage thermal desorption.

=== Two-stage thermal desorption ===
This involves sampling first onto a sorbent tube. The most widely used tubes are those following the pattern laid out by WG5 (see above). After sampling (for which a variety of accessories are available), the tube is desorbed to transfer the analytes to the focusing trap before the second desorption stage transfers them to the GC. The greater sensitivity of this method has made it increasingly popular for sampling dilute gas streams, or in exploratory work where the target atmosphere is unknown.

- Diffusive (or passive) sampling – A tube is packed with a single sorbent bed and allowed to adsorb analytes from the air diffusively. It is suitable for sampling known compounds over a period of hours (for analyte concentrations of 2–10 μg/m^{3}) to weeks (for analyte concentrations of 0.3–300 μg/m^{3}).
- Pumped (or active) sampling – A tube is packed with up to three sorbent beds and a flow of the sample gas passed through it. It is suitable for sampling high and low concentrations of known and unknown compounds over timescales of minutes to hours.
- Direct desorption – This is used for sampling emissions from small pieces of solid or semi-solid materials. The material is placed inside a tube and heated to release the vapours directly into the focusing trap.
- Headspace – The material is placed in a (micro-)chamber or other sampling container, and a flow of gas passed through it to transfer the headspace dynamically onto a sorbent tube.

== Sorbents ==
The sorbent tube and the focusing trap may be packed with one or more sorbents. The type and number of sorbents depends on a number of factors including the sampling setup, the analyte volatility range, analyte concentration, and the humidity of the sample.

One of the most versatile and popular sorbents for thermal desorption is poly(2,6-diphenyl-p-phenylene oxide), known by its trademark Tenax.

== Analyte range ==
Depending upon the sampling technique and the analytical conditions, thermal desorption can be used to reliably sample analytes ranging in volatility from ethane to about tetracontane (n-C_{40}H_{82}). Incompatible compounds include:

- Many inorganic gases (although N_{2}O, H_{2}S and SF_{6} can be monitored using TD)
- Methane
- Compounds that are thermally unstable
- Compounds heavier than n-C_{44}H_{90}, didecyl phthalate or 6-ring polycyclic aromatic hydrocarbons boiling above 525 °C.

== Applications ==
Applications of thermal desorption were originally restricted to occupational health monitoring, but have since extended to cover a much wider range. Some of the most important are mentioned below – where available, examples of early reports, and more recent citations (including those of widely used standard methods) have been given:

- Outdoor environmental monitoring
- Workplace/occupational health monitoring
- Residual volatiles emitted from products and materials
- Studies of biological systems, including plant–herbivore interactions
- Breath analysis for disease diagnosis
- Aroma profiling of food and drink
- Defence/homeland security (detection of chemical agents)
