= Atlas Werke =

Historic shipbuilding company, incubator of several industrial development units

Atlas Werke AG
- Industry: Shipbuilding; Electronics
- Founded: 1911
- Defunct: 1969
- Fate: Spin-off
- Successor: Atlas Elektronik
- Headquarters: Bremen, Germany
- Products: Merchant ships Warships; U-boats
- Parent: Krupp

Atlas Werke was a German shipbuilding company, located in Bremen. It was founded in 1911.

During World War I Atlas Werke built one single U 151 U-boat for the Kaiserliche Marine, the U-156.

After the war, Atlas Werke also started to make echo sounders and other nautical instruments. In 1948, Ludolf Jenckel set up a division to produce mass spectrometers, the Mess- und Analysen Technik (MAT) division. They developed the CH3 prototype (1950), the CH4 (1958) and were sold (by Krupp) in 1967 to Varian Associates. The company in Bremen was then sold to Finnigan in 1981 to form the Finnigan MAT brand which was acquired by Thermo Electron (becoming Thermo Fisher Scientific in 2006).

In 1964, Krupp acquired a majority shareholding in Atlas Werke and the electronics division was spun off as the independent company Atlas Elektronik in Bremen-Sebaldsbrück. All shipbuilding was ceased in 1969.

== See also ==
- Atlas GmbH
