= Triple quadrupole mass spectrometer =

Type of mass spectrometer

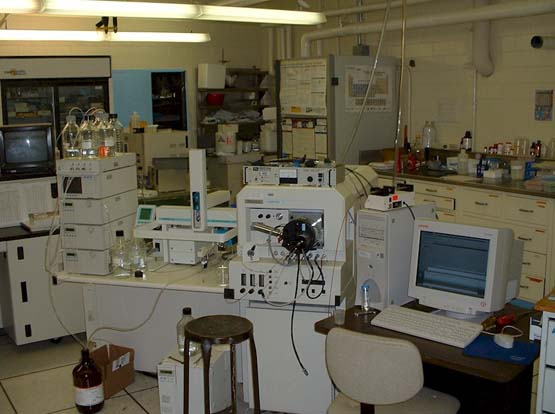
Waters Quattro II triple quadropole mass spectrometer (center). This photo was taken in the old mass spec facility in Whitmore Lab of Pennsylvania State University.

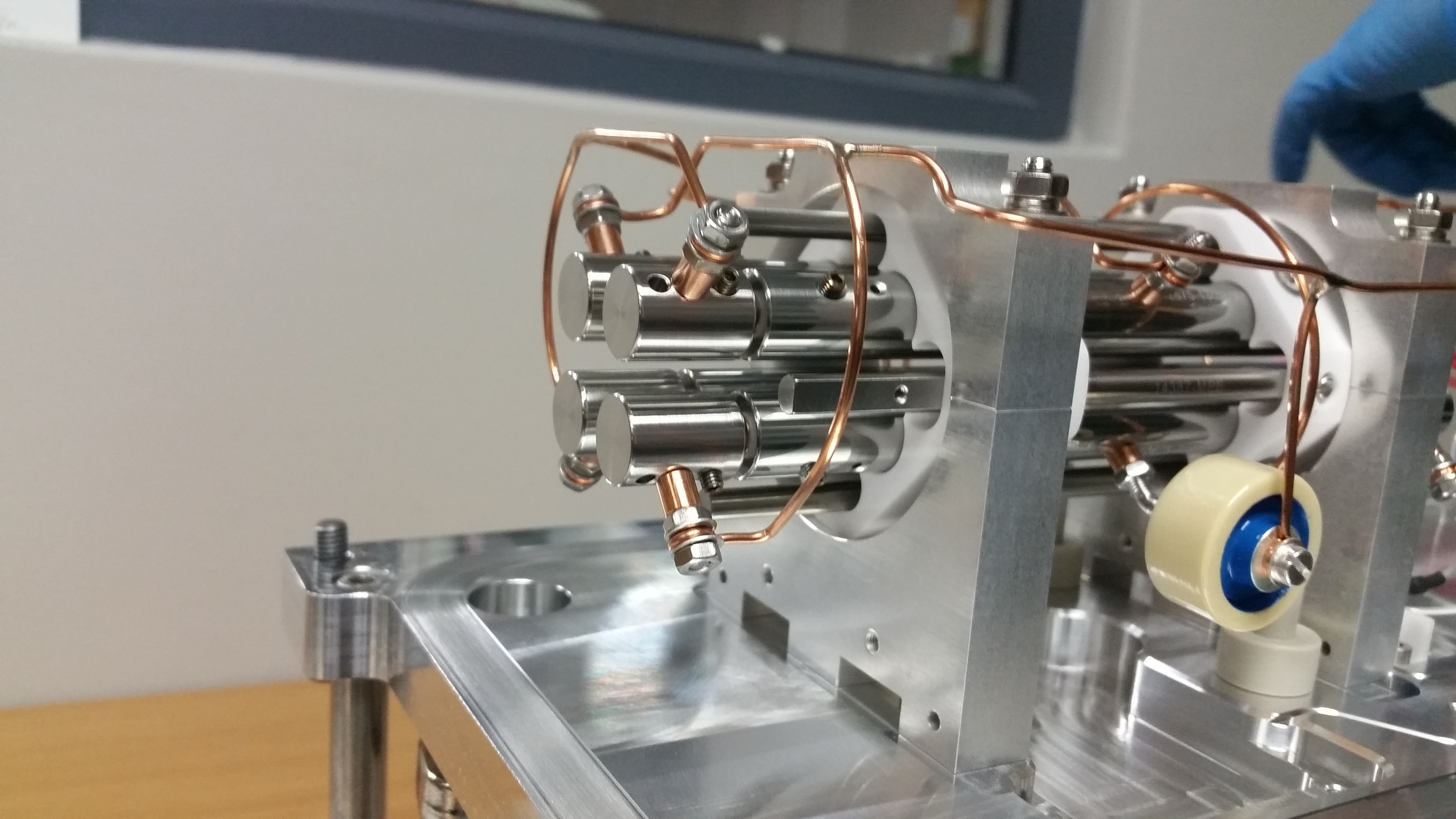
Quadrupole from a Waters TQ-S triple quadrupole mass spectrometer

A triple quadrupole mass spectrometer (TQMS), is a tandem mass spectrometer consisting of two quadrupole mass analyzers in series, with a (non-mass-resolving) radio frequency (RF)–only quadrupole between them to act as a cell for collision-induced dissociation. This configuration is often abbreviated QqQ, here Q_{1}q_{2}Q_{3}.

== History ==
The arrangement of three quadrupoles was first developed by J.D. Morrison of La Trobe University, Australia for the purpose of studying the photodissociation of gas-phase ions. After coming into contact with Prof. Christie G. Enke and his then graduate student Richard Yost, Morrison's linear arrangement of the three quadrupoles probed the construction of the first triple-quadrupole mass spectrometer. In the years following, the first commercial triple-quadrupole mass spectrometer was developed at Michigan State University by Enke and Yost in the late 1970s. It was later found that the triple-quadrupole mass spectrometer could be utilized to study organic ions and molecules, thus expanding its capabilities as a tandem MS/MS technique.

== Principle of operation ==
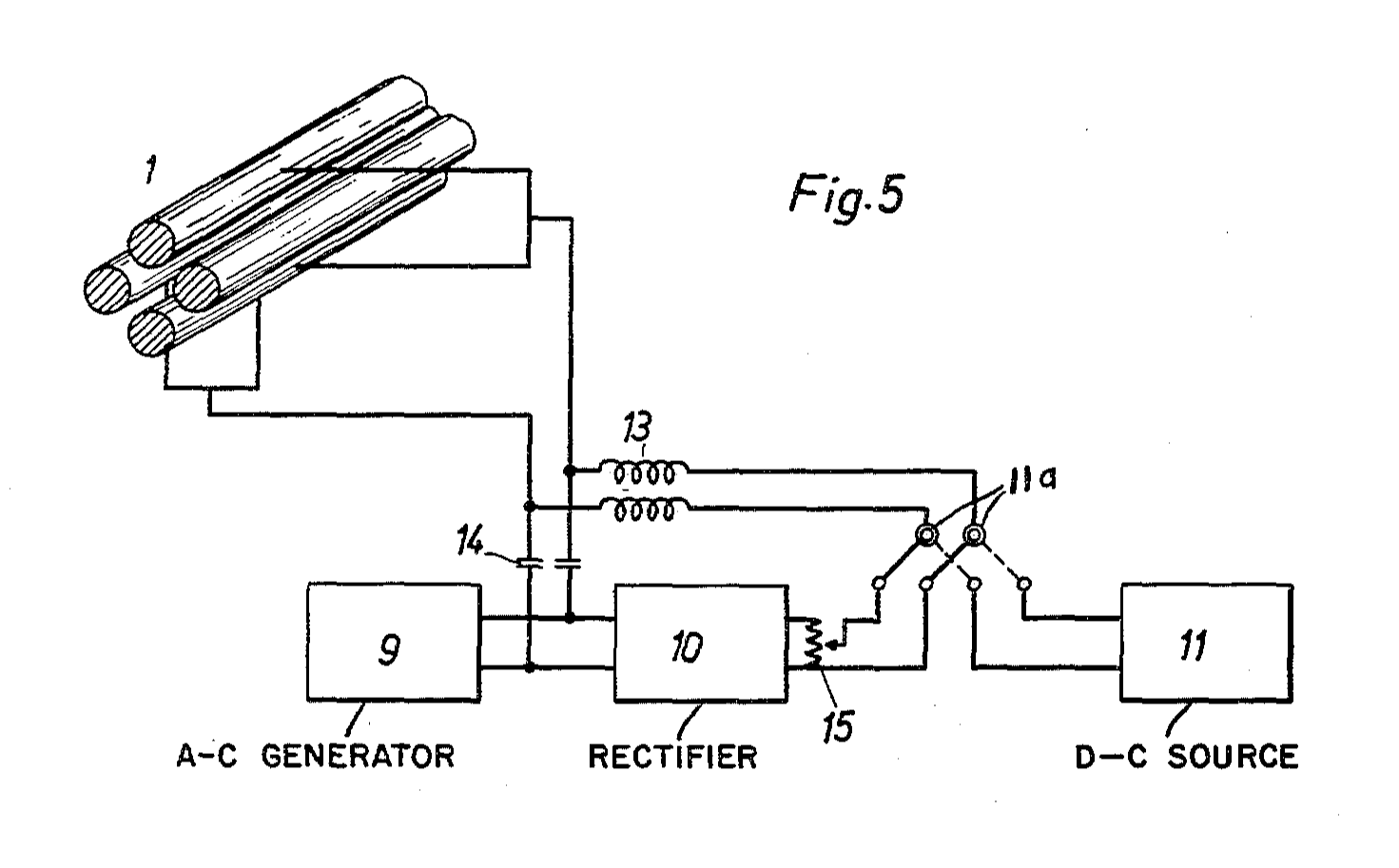
Paul Patent 2939952 Fig5

The triple quadrupole mass spectrometer essentially operates under the same principle as the single quadrupole mass analyzer. Each of the two mass filters (Q1 and Q3) contains four parallel, cylindrical metal rods. Both Q1 and Q3 are controlled by direct current (dc) and radio-frequency (rf) potentials, while the collision cell, q, is only subjected to RF potential. The RF potential associated with the collision cell (q) allows all ions that were selected for to pass through it. In some instruments, the normal quadrupole collision cell has been replaced by hexapole or octopole collision cells which improve efficiency.

Unlike traditional MS techniques, MS/MS techniques allow for mass analysis to occur in a sequential manner in different regions of the instruments. The TQMS follows the tandem-in-space arrangement, due to ionization, primary mass selection, collision induced dissociation (CID), mass analysis of fragments produced during CID, and detection occurring in separate segments of the instrument. Sector instruments tend to surpass the TQMS in mass resolution and mass range. However, the triple quadrupole has the advantage of being cheaper, easy to operate and highly efficient. Also, when operated in the selected reaction monitoring mode, the TQMS has superior detection sensitivity as well as quantification. The triple quadrupole allows the study of low-energy low-molecule reactions, which is useful when small molecules are being analyzed.

=== Scan modes ===
Settings associated with selecting m/z values in both mass filters of a triple quadrupole mass analyzer

The arrangement of the TQMS allows for four different scan types to be performed: a precursor ion scan, neutral loss scan, product ion scan, and selected reaction monitoring.

==== Product scan ====
In the product scan, the first quadrupole Q_{1} is set to select an ion of a known mass, which is fragmented in q_{2}. The third quadrupole Q_{3} is then set to scan the entire m/z range, giving information on the sizes of the fragments made. The structure of the original ion can be deduced from the ion fragmentation information. This method is commonly performed to identify transitions used for quantification by tandem MS.

==== Precursor scan ====
When utilizing a precursor scan, a certain product ion is selected in Q_{3}, and the precursor masses are scanned in Q_{1}. This method is selective for ions having a particular functional group (e.g., a phenyl group) released by the fragmentation in q_{2}.

==== Neutral loss scan ====
In the neutral loss scan method both Q_{1} and Q_{3} are scanned together, but with a constant mass offset. This allows the selective recognition of all ions which, by fragmentation in q_{2}, lead to the loss of a given neutral fragment (e.g., H_{2}O, NH_{3}). Similar to the precursor ion scan, this method is useful in the selective identification of closely related compounds in a mixture.

==== Selected reaction monitoring ====
When employing selected reaction monitoring (SRM) or multiple reaction monitoring (MRM) modes, both Q_{1} and Q_{3} are set at a specific mass, allowing only a distinct fragment ion from a certain precursor ion to be detected. This method results in increased sensitivity. If Q_{1} and/or Q_{3} is set to more than a single mass, this configuration is called multiple reaction monitoring.

== Instrumentation ==
Schematic of a triple quadrupole mass spectrometer

In the TQMS, several ionization methods can be employed. Some of these include electrospray ionization, chemical ionization, electron ionization, atmospheric pressure chemical ionization, and matrix-assisted laser desorption ionization, all of which produce a continuous supply of ions.

Both, the first mass analyzer and the collision cell are continuously exposed to ions from the source, in a time independent manner. It is once the ions move into the third mass analyzer that time dependence becomes a factor. The first quadrupole mass filter, Q1, is the primary m/z selector after the sample leaves the ionization source. Any ions with mass-to-charge ratios other than the one selected for will not be allowed to infiltrate Q1. The collision cell, denoted as "q", is located between Q1 and Q3, is where fragmentation of the sample occurs in the presence of an inert gas like Ar, He, or N2. A characteristic daughter ion is produced as a result of the collisions of the inert gas with the analyte. Upon exiting the collision cell, the fragmented ions then travel onto the second quadrupole mass filter, Q3, where m/z selection can occur again.

Because the triple quadrupole is a scanning instrument, the type of detection system it employs must be capable of detecting ions one m/z at a time. One of the most common detectors, the electron multiplier, is often paired with the triple quadrupole. The electron multiplier allows for faster response time, increased sensitivity and higher gain. However, they have a limited lifetime due to overloading. Employing the TQMS provides enhanced selectivity, better accuracy, and greater reproducibility; all of which are limited in single quadrupole mass analyzers.

== Applications ==
The triple quadrupole mass spectrometer allows for increased sensitivity and specificity yielding lower detection and quantitation limits. For these reasons, employment of the TQMS is a vital asset in the fields of drug metabolism, pharmacokinetics, environmental studies, and biological analyses. In most drug and pharmacokinetic studies, animals like rats, are subjected to a new drug in order to probe how the substance metabolizes in the body. By analyzing the rat’s urine or plasma with a triple quadrupole coupled to liquid chromatography, the concentration and fragmentation pattern of the new drug can be determined. In environmental and biological studies, the triple quadrupole is useful for quantitative studies that involved identifying whether or not specific substances are present in a sample. One of the more common uses of a triple quadrupole mass analyzer is for structural elucidation, which provides information about fragmentation patterns. However, a mass spectrum only provides information about fragmentation, which isn't enough information to fully deduce the structure of a molecule or compound. So for the purpose of structural elucidation, it is paired with data obtained from other analytical methods, like nuclear magnetic resonance (NMR) spectroscopy and infrared spectroscopy (IR), for a more accurate analysis.

== See also ==
- Hybrid mass spectrometer
