= Prolate trochoidal mass spectrometer =

A prolate trochoidal mass spectrometer is a chemical analysis instrument in which the ions of different mass-to-charge ratio are separated by means of mutually perpendicular electric and magnetic fields so that the ions follow a prolate trochoidal path. These devices are sometimes called cycloidal mass spectrometers, although the path is not a cycloid (the prolate trochoid path has loops, the cycloid has cusps).

== Applications ==
The instruments are used for the analysis of gases and in gas chromatography-mass spectrometry. The trochoidal configuration can also be used as the basis of an electron monochromator.
