= Jim Morrison (chemist) =

Australian physical chemist

Professor Jim Morrison AO FAA FRSE FRACI
- Born: James Douglas Morrison; 9 November 1924; Glasgow, Scotland
- Died: 2013
- Education: University of Glasgow
- Known for: Mass spectrometry
- Scientific career
- Fields: Analytical chemistry
- Workplaces: La Trobe University
- Doctoral advisor: John Monteath Robertson

James Douglas Morrison (1924–2013) was an Australian physical chemist. Born and educated in Glasgow (BSc 1945, PhD 1948), he moved to Australia in 1949 to work with the CSIRO. There he switched from X-ray crystallography to mass spectrometry as a research topic. In 1967 he was appointed as the foundation chair of physical chemistry at La Trobe University, where he was a professor of chemistry until retiring in 1989.

He is known for his work in mass spectrometry and he is one of the inventors of the triple quadrupole mass spectrometer.
