= Residual gas analyzer =

Small mass spectrometer

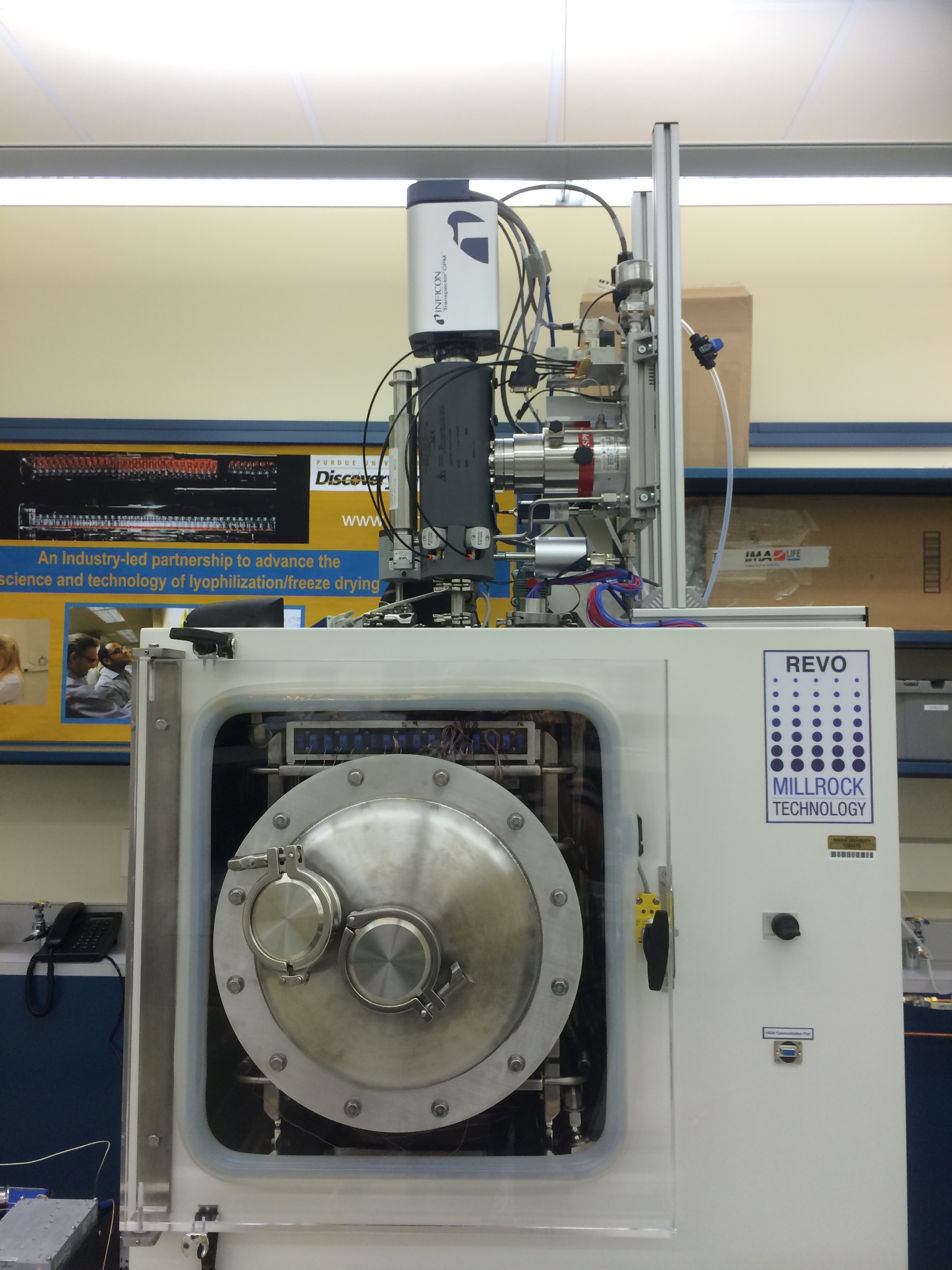
- Residual gas analyzer installed on a laboratory-scale freeze dryer
- Acronym: RGA
- Uses: Process gas measurement
- Manufacturer: INFICON
- Model: Transpector 200

A residual gas analyzer (RGA) is a small and usually rugged mass spectrometer, typically designed for process control and contamination monitoring in vacuum systems. When constructed as a quadrupole mass analyzer, there exist two implementations, utilizing either an open ion source (OIS) or a closed ion source (CIS). RGAs may be found in high vacuum applications such as research chambers, surface science setups, accelerators, scanning microscopes, etc. RGAs are used in most cases to monitor the quality of the vacuum and easily detect minute traces of impurities in the low-pressure gas environment. These impurities can be measured down to $10^{-14}$ Torr levels, possessing sub-ppm detectability in the absence of background interferences.

RGAs would also be used as sensitive in-situ leak detectors commonly using helium, isopropyl alcohol or other tracer molecules. With vacuum systems pumped down to lower than $10^{-5}$ Torr—checking of the integrity of the vacuum seals and the quality of the vacuum—air leaks, virtual leaks and other contaminants at low levels may be detected before a process is initiated.

== Open ion source ==
OIS is the most widely available type of RGA. Residual Gas Analyzers measure pressure by sensing the weight of each atom as they pass through the quadrupole. Cylindrical and axially symmetrical, this kind of ionizer has been around since the early 1950s. The OIS type is usually mounted directly to the vacuum chamber, exposing the filament wire and anode wire cage to the surrounding vacuum chamber, allowing all molecules in the vacuum chamber to move easily through the ion source. With a maximum operating pressure of $10^{-4}$ Torr and a minimum detectable partial pressure as low as $10^{-14}$ Torr when used in tandem with an electron multiplier.

OIS RGAs measure residual gas levels without affecting the gas composition of their vacuum environment, though there are performance limitations which include:

- Outgassing of water from the chamber, $H_{2}$ from the OIS electrodes and most varieties of 300-series stainless steel used in the surrounding vacuum chamber due to the high temperatures of the hot-cathode source (> 1300 °C).
- Electron Stimulated Desorption (ESD) is noted by peaks observed at 12, 16, 19 and 35 u rather than by electron-impact ionization of gaseous species, with the effects similar to outgassing effects. This is frequently counteracted by gold-plating the ionizer which in turn reduces the adsorption of many gases. Using platinum-clad molybdenum ionizers is an alternative.

== Closed ion source ==
With applications requiring measurement of pressures between $10^{-4}$ and $10^{-3}$ Torr, the problem of ambient and process gases can be significantly reduced by replacing the OIS configuration with a CIS sampling system. Such an ionizer sits on top of the quadrupole mass filter and consists of a short, gas-tight tube with two openings for the entrance of electrons and exit of ions. The ions are formed close to a single extraction plate and exit the ionizer. Electrically insulated alumina rings seal the tube and the biased electrodes from the rest of the quadrupole mass assembly. The ions are produced by electron impact directly at the process pressure. Such design has been applied to gas chromatography mass spectrometry instruments before adaption by quadrupole gas analyzers. Most commercially available CIS systems operate between $10^{-2}$ and $10^{-11}$ Torr and offer ppm level detectability over the entire mass range for process pressures between $10^{-4}$ and $10^{-2}$ Torr. The upper limit is set by reduction in mean free path for ion-neutral collisions which takes place at higher pressures, and results in the scattering of ions and reduced sensitivity.

The CIS anode may be viewed as a high conductance tube connected directly to the process chamber. The pressure in the ionization area is virtually the same as the rest of the chamber. Thus the CIS ionizer produces ions by electron impact directly at the process pressure whilst the rest of the mass analyzer is kept under high vacuum. Such direct sampling provides good sensitivity and fast response times.
