= Hybrid mass spectrometer =

A hybrid mass spectrometer is a device for tandem mass spectrometry that consists of a combination of two or more m/z separation devices of different types.

== Notation ==
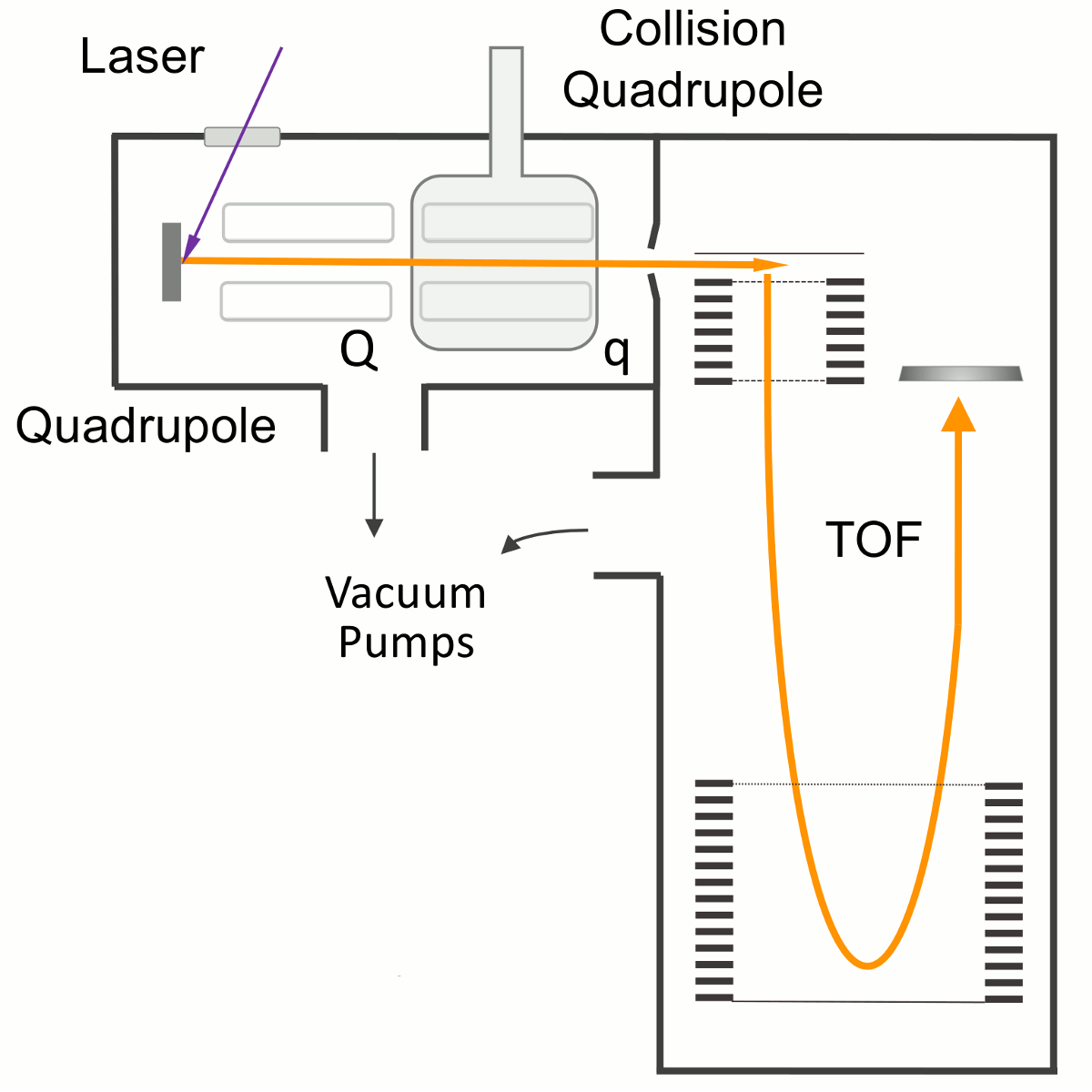
Schematic of a quadrupole time-of-flight (QTOF) mass spectrometer.

The different m/z separation elements of a hybrid mass spectrometer can be represented by a shorthand notation. The symbol Q represents a quadrupole mass analyzer, q is a radio frequency collision quadrupole, TOF is a time-of-flight mass spectrometer, B is a magnetic sector and E is an electric sector.

== Sector quadrupole ==
A sector instrument can be combined with a collision quadrupole and quadrupole mass analyzer to form a hybrid instrument. A BEqQ configuration with a magnetic sector (B), electric sector (E), collision quadrupole (q) and m/z selection quadrupole (Q) have been constructed and an instrument with two electric sectors (BEEQ) has been described.

== Quadrupole time-of-flight ==
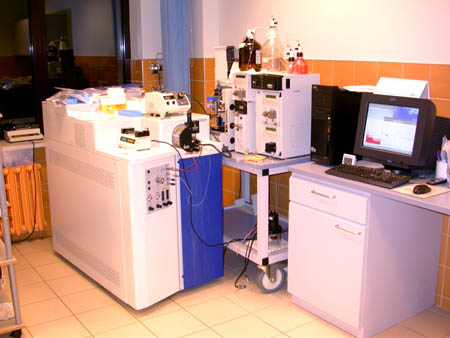
Hybrid quadrupole time-of-flight mass spectrometer.

A triple quadrupole mass spectrometer with the final quadrupole replaced by a time-of-flight device is known as a quadrupole time-of-flight instrument. Such an instrument can be represented as QqTOF.

== Ion trap time-of-flight ==
In an ion trap instrument, ions are trapped in a quadrupole ion trap and then injected into the TOF. The trap can be 3-D or a linear trap.

== Linear ion trap and Fourier transform mass analyzers ==
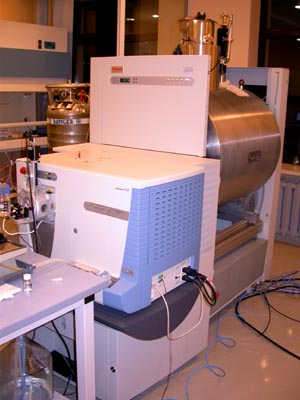
Hybrid linear ion trap Fourier transform ion cyclotron resonance mass spectrometer

A linear ion trap combined with a Fourier transform ion cyclotron resonance or Orbitrap mass spectrometer is marketed by Thermo Scientific as the LTQ FT and LTQ Orbitrap, respectively.
