= Richard Yost =

American scientist

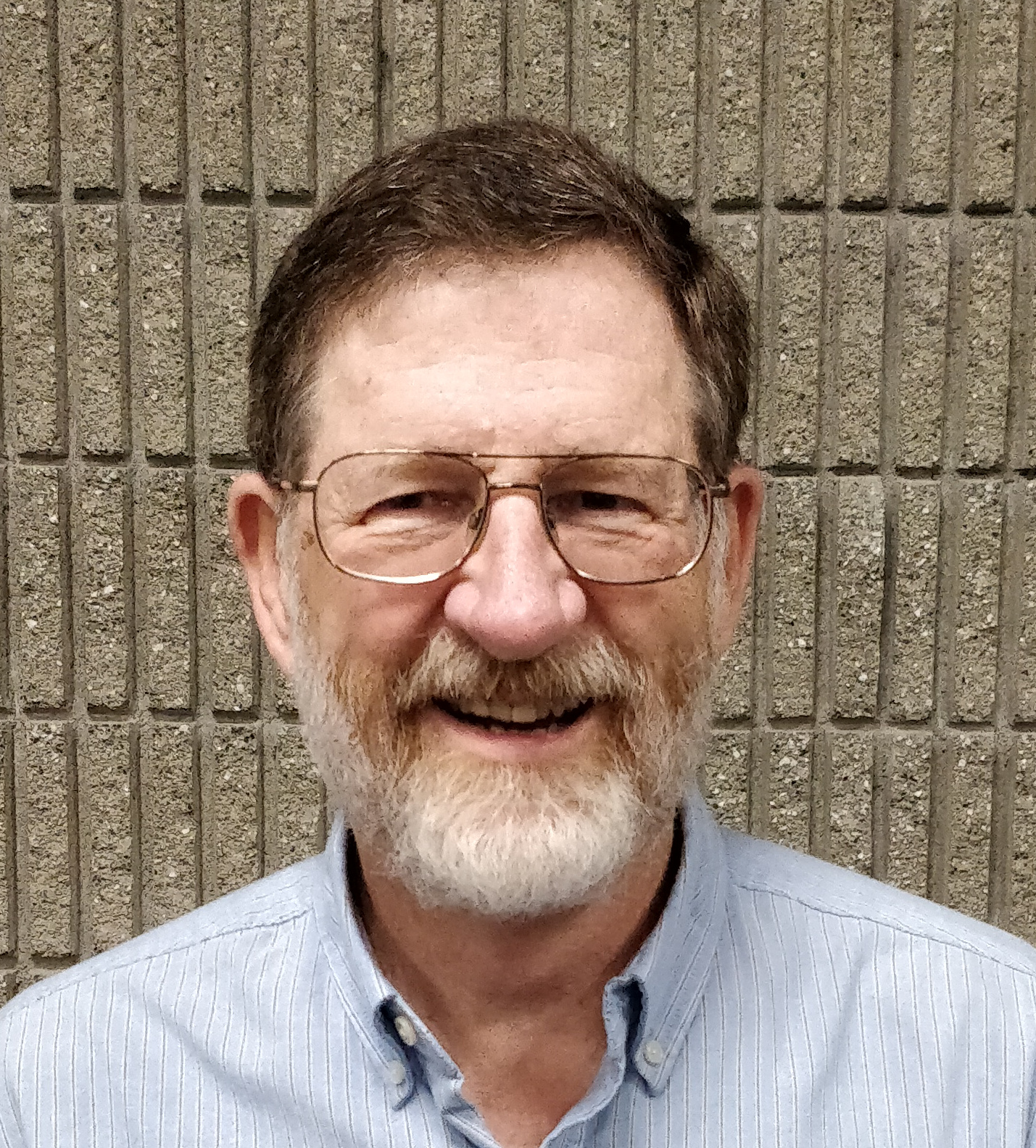
- Richard Yost at ASMS 2019
- Born: May 31, 1953 (age 73)
- Education: Michigan State University
- Known for: mass spectrometry (invention of triple quadrupole mass spectrometer)
- Scientific career
- Fields: Analytical chemistry, mass spectrometry
- Workplaces: University of Florida
- Doctoral advisor: Chris Enke
- Website: https://yost.chem.ufl.edu/

Richard A Yost (born 31 May 1953 in Martins Ferry) is an American scientist and University Professor Emeritus at the University of Florida. He is best known for his work inventing the triple quadrupole mass spectrometer. Yost received his BS degree in chemistry in 1974 from the University of Arizona, having performed undergraduate research in chromatography with Mike Burke and his PhD degree in Analytical Chemistry in 1979 from Michigan State University, having performed graduate research with Chris Enke.

He joined the faculty of the University of Florida after his graduate research. He served as director of the Southeast Center for Integrated Metabolomics (SECIM) and of NIH's Metabolomics Consortium Coordinating Center (M3C). He is also a Professor of Pathology at both the University of Florida and the University of Utah/ARUP.

His professional activities have focused on research and teaching in analytical mass spectrometry, particularly tandem mass spectrometry (MS/MS). His group's research has reflected a unique balance between instrumentation development, fundamental studies, and applications in analytical chemistry. His group has led in the application of novel mass spectrometric methods and techniques to areas such as metabolomics, clinical, biomedical, pharmaceutical, environmental, petrochemical, and forensic chemistry. Yost has supervised the research of over 120 graduate students during the past 44 years, graduating over 100 PhDs from his group. He has served as PI or Co-PI on grants and contracts totaling over $65M of funding. Research in the group has led to over 240 publications and 25 patents.

He is one of the inventors of the triple quadrupole mass spectrometer. He won the ASMS Award for Distinguished Contribution to Mass Spectrometry along with Chris Enke in 1993. His research has also been recognized with the 2018 MSACL Award for Distinguished Contribution to Clinical Mass Spectrometry, and the 2019 CPSA Distinguished Analytical Scientist Award. In 2019 he was named the Florida Academy of Sciences Medalist, and was inducted into the Florida Inventors Hall of Fame.

His research interests lie in mass spectrometric instrumentation and applications in analytical chemistry. This includes the development of new mass spectrometric and ion mobility instrumentation and techniques and their application to biology and chemistry.

Yost has served on the Florida Board of Governors (Regents) and the University of Florida Board of Trustees. In 2019 he received the Distinguished Eagle Scout Award. Yost also served as the president of the American Society for Mass Spectrometry.
