= Christie G. Enke =

American chemist (born 1933)

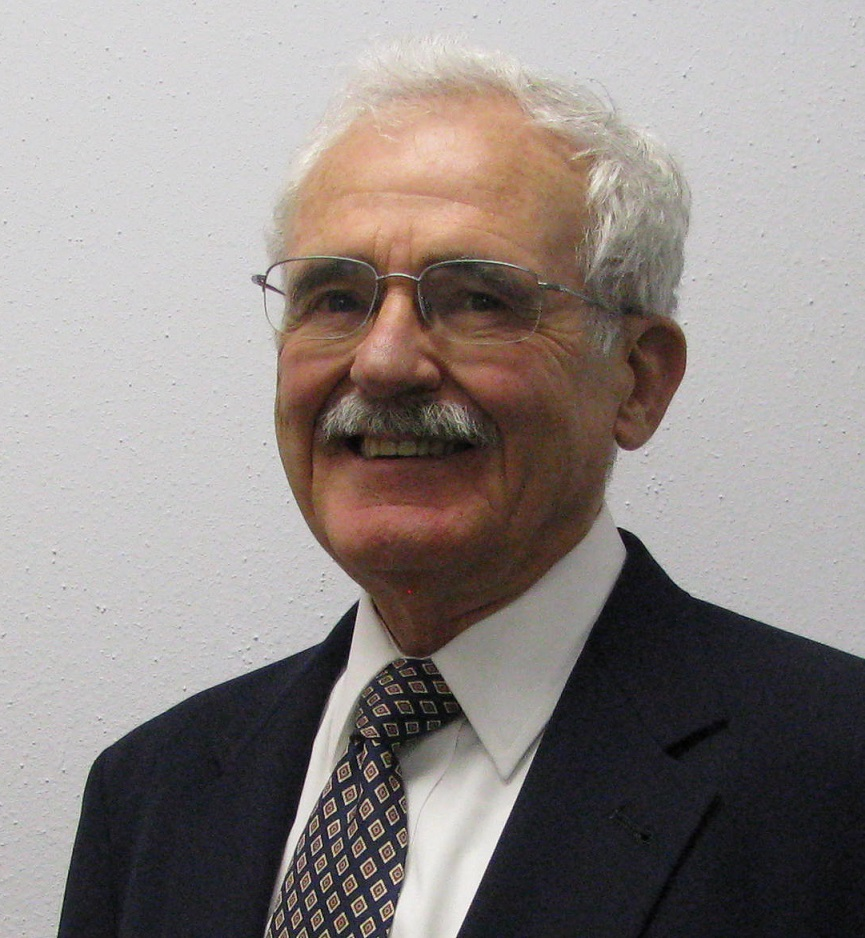
- Chris Enke
- Born: July 8, 1933 (age 93); Minneapolis, Minnesota, U.S.
- Education: Principia College; University of Illinois
- Known for: Electrospray ionization Mass Spectrometry chemical instrumentation
- Scientific career
- Fields: Chemist
- Workplaces: Princeton University; Michigan State University; University of New Mexico
- Doctoral advisor: Herbert August Laitinen

Christie G. Enke is a United States academic chemist who made pioneering contributions to the field of analytical chemistry.

== Life and career ==
Chris Enke was born in Minneapolis, Minnesota on July 8, 1933. His parents were Alvin Enke and Mae Nichols. He graduated from Central High School in Minneapolis in 1951. He received a BA degree from Principia College in 1955 and a PhD from the University of Illinois in 1959. His thesis, concerning the anodic formation of surface oxide films on platinum electrodes, was performed under the guidance of Herbert Laitinen. While at Illinois, he also worked with Howard Malmstadt to introduce a graduate lab and lecture course in the electronics of laboratory instrumentation. He is now Professor Emeriti of Chemistry at the University of New Mexico and Michigan State University. Prior to his move to the University of New Mexico in 1994, he was an instructor and assistant professor at Princeton (1959 –1966), then an associate professor and professor at Michigan State University.

External videos
- Chris Enke, on the Triple Quadrupole breakthrough discovery: "It's a really interesting story because ... one man's noise is another man's answer.", Chemical Heritage Foundation

== Education ==
- 1955 B.S. Principia College
- 1959 M.S. University of Illinois
- 1959 PhD University of Illinois

== Research and teaching ==
- Electroanalytical chemistry: Enke's early research in electrochemistry centered on high-speed charge transfer kinetic studies. He also pioneered the use of operational amplifiers in electroanalytical instrumentation and later, computer control. He is co-inventor of the bipolar pulse method for measuring electrolytic conductance.
- Teaching electronics to scientists: Howard Malmstadt and Enke wrote the pioneering work, Electronics for Scientists. Then Malmstadt, Stan Crouch, and Enke wrote eight more texts and lab books in the electronics of laboratory instrumentation. This same team developed and presented the hands-on ACS short course, Electronics for Laboratory Instrumentation beginning in 1979. Enke also wrote an introductory analytical chemistry text called The Art and Science of Chemical Analysis.
- Mass spectrometry: Enke, his graduate student, Rick Yost, and a colleague, James Morrison, discovered low-energy collisional ion fragmentation in 1979. Collisional dissociation in an RF-only quadrupole mass filter between two quadrupole mass analyzers resulted in the first triple quadrupole mass spectrometer. Its low cost and unit resolution ushered in the technique now known as tandem mass spectrometry. Enke continued research in mass spectrometry including developing a distributed microprocessor control system for the triple-quadrupole, a fast integrating detector system for time-of-flight mass spectrometry, development of a tandem time-of-flight instrument with photofragmentation of ions, the equilibrium partition theory of electrospray ionization, and the invention of distance-of-flight mass spectrometry.
- Comprehensive analysis of complex mixtures: With Luc Nagels, Enke discovered that the concentrations of components in many natural complex mixtures have a log-normal distribution. With this information, one can learn the number and concentrations of components that are below the detection limit.

== Awards ==
- 1974 American Chemical Society Award for Chemical Instrumentation
- 1981 Fellow, American Association for the Advancement of Science
- 1989 American Chemical Society Award for Computers in Chemistry
- 1992 Michigan State University Distinguished Faculty Award
- 1993 Distinguished Contribution in Mass Spectrometry Award (shared with Richard Yost)
- 2003 J. Calvin Giddings Award for Excellence in Education from Analytical Division of the American Chemical Society
- 2011 American Chemical Society Award in Analytical Chemistry
- 2011 Fellow, American Chemical Society
- 2014 Distinguished Service in the Advancement of Analytical Chemistry Award from the Analytical Division of the American Chemical Society
- 2015 Eastern Analytical Symposium Award for Outstanding Achievements in the Fields of Analytical Chemistry

== Service ==
- Chair-elect, Chair and Past Chair, Analytical Division, American Chemical Society, 2004-2008
- V.P. for Programs, President, Past President, American Society for Mass Spectrometry, 1992-1998
- Program Chairman, Chairman, Div. of Computers in Chem., American Chemical Society, 1981-1985
- Editorial Advisory Board, Analytical Chemistry, 1972-1974
- Chair, Physical Electrochemistry Div., The Electrochemical. Soc.1963-1971
