= List of LIMS software packages =

List of notable laboratory information management system software

This is a list of proprietary laboratory information management systems (LIMS) from businesses and organizations which have articles about them in Wikipedia.

Laboratory Information Management Systems
| LIMS Product | Vendor |
|---|---|
| BaseSpace Clarity LIMS | Illumina |
| BIOVIA ONE Lab | Dassault Systèmes |
| CCLAS | ABB Group |
| ELab | LabLynx |
| Hach WIMS | Hach Company |
| LABbase | Analytik Jena |
| LabKey LIMS | LabKey |
| LabWare LIMS | LabWare, Inc. |
| LabVantage LIMS | LabVantage |
| Nautilus LIMS | Thermo Fisher Scientific |
| NuGenesis 8 | Waters Corporation |
| OmicsHub | Integromics |
| OpreX LIMS | Yokogawa Electric |
| readyLIMS | Analytik Jena |
| SampleManager LIMS | Thermo Fisher Scientific |
| SampleTrack | Bruker |
| Sapio LIMS | Sapio Sciences |
| SIMATIC IT R&D Suite / Dotmatics | Siemens |
| SLIMS | Agilent Technologies |
| STARLIMS | Starlims |
| TrakCare Lab Enterprise | InterSystems |
| Watson LIMS | Thermo Fisher Scientific |
| webLIMS | LabLynx |

== See also ==
Magazines and journals covering LIMS

- Scientific Computing & Instrumentation
