= Dotmatics =

R&D scientific software company in the US

- Type: Subsidiary
- Industry: Life Sciences, Cheminformatics, Bioinformatics
- Founded: 2005; 21 years ago
- Founders: Stephen Gallagher, Alastair Hill
- Headquarters: Boston, Massachusetts, USA
- Key people: Brian Lee (CEO)
- Products: Dotmatics Platform; SnapGene; Geneious; GraphPad Prism; LabArchives
- Number of employees: 800 (2022)
- Parent: Siemens
- Website: www.dotmatics.com

Dotmatics is an R&D scientific software company used by scientists in the R&D process.

Founded in 2005, its primary office is in Boston with 14 offices around the globe. Dotmatics' software is used by 2 million scientists and researchers and 10,000 customers.

It offers a cloud-based data management platform to support the R&D process and a series of software applications used by scientists that include GraphPad Prism, SnapGene, Geneious Prime, Geneious Biologics, Lab Archives, OMIQ, Protein Metrics, nQuery, Cytapex Bioinformatics, De Novo, SoftGenetics, and M-Star.

In October 2023, Dotmatics released a multimodal drug discovery platform named Luma. Luma is a low-code SaaS platform that aggregates relevant data across instruments and software into clean data structures for AI and ML-based analysis.

In April 2025, Siemens announced it will acquire Dotmatics for $5.1B from Insight Partners. On July 1, 2025, it was announced that the purchase was completed.

== History ==
Dotmatics' origins trace back to Merck Sharp and Dohme, a multinational pharmaceutical company, where, in the early 2000s, Merck staff developed what later became Dotmatics' browser and gateway software. Dotmatics Limited was founded in 2005 as a spin-out when Merck closed the site.

The company was established with the intent to address the information needs of scientists in the biotech/pharma space. At one point, it was backed by Insight Partners, a venture capital and private equity firm.

- Nov. 2006: Incorporate Astex Therapeutics' chemical structure searching software as the product pinpoint.
- Oct. 2007: Headquarters moved to new premises in Bishops Stortford, United Kingdom.
- March 2009: Opened West Coast US office in Biotech Beach area of San Diego.
- Oct. 2009: Launched in Japanese market via Tokyo-based Infocom Corporation.
- April 2010: Opened East Coast US office in Boston Massachusetts.
- April 2010: Launched web-based Studies Notebook, for Windows, Mac, and Linux.
- Dec. 2010: Headquarters moved to expanded premises.
- March 2011, Studies Notebook integrated Lexichem chemical naming from OpenEye Scientific Software, to automate name-to-structure and structure-to-name conversions in English and foreign languages.
- April 2011: Elemental web-based structure drawing tool included in ChemSpider, the Royal Society of Chemistry's community website.
- Sept. 2011: Move East Coast office from Boston's financial district to Woburn MA.
- Oct 2014: 2013 Revenue is over £5M.
- Sept 2017: 2016 Revenue is over £12.8M.
- Oct 2017: Significant investment by Scottish Equity Partners
- June 2020: BioBright acquired diversifying into Laboratory Automation technology.
- July 2020: 2019 Revenue is over £26M.
- March 2021: Insightful Science acquires Dotmatics; Thomas Swalla named CEO.
- April 2022: Dotmatics used as the consolidated brand name of the combined Insightful Science and Dotmatics entity.
- Oct 2023: Dotmatics releases Luma, a new scientific data platform.
- April 2025: Siemens announced it will acquire Dotmatics for $5.1B. The purchase was completed three months later.
- December 2025: Brian Lee named CEO after Thomas Swalla's departure.

== Software and use ==
Dotmatics develops web-based tools for querying, browsing, managing, and sharing scientific data and documents.

- Browser, a web-based tool for "chemically-aware" querying and browsing biological and chemical datasets, analysis of plate-based data, upload of data sets from Microsoft Excel; and registration.
- Vortex for visualizing and data-mining biological and chemical information. Vortex provides structure-based searching, together with physiochemical property calculations.
- Pinpoint, an Oracle-based tool for querying and integrating chemical databases.
- Gateway, a document management system and collaboration tool.
- Nucleus, a web-based tool for importing, mapping, and storing data from existing sources.
- Register, a web-based tool for single and batch chemical compound registration.
- Bioregister, for registering biological entities (protein and nucleotide sequences), as well as their clone vector, purification and expression information.
- Studies is a screening data management tool that allows creation, capture, analysis, and storage of chemical, biological, and ad hoc research data.
- Studies notebook, a Web-based Electronic lab notebook that supports chemistry, biology, and ad hoc research. It combines a web-based platform with intellectual property protection tools.
- Elemental, a web-based structure drawing tool for drawing simple chemical structures or complex structure queries directly within a webpage. Also available as an iOS app.
- Cascade, a Web-based workflow management tool that controls workflow among different departments using the Electronic lab notebook.
- Dotmatics for Office (D4O) makes Microsoft™ Office® applications such as Excel®, PowerPoint®, Word and Outlook® chemically aware.
- Chemselector manages very large chemistry datasets with fast search and trivially simple maintenance/update. It has a modern user interface focused on browsing and filtering for molecule, reagent and sample selection. The available eMolecules+ for Chemselector dataset provides access to highly curated eMolecules sourcing data.
- Inventory is a fully searchable sample and materials inventory that tracks chemicals, biologics, instruments and associated data across a hierarchy of locations and manages the dispensing and plating workflows, as samples are moved through an R&D process.
- Spaces allows project members within distributed research teams to collaborate using scientific teamboards that organize their research data and design ideas.
- Reaction Workflows, a graphical environment that enables scientists to build and execute data processing workflows to perform common cheminformatics tasks, such as library enumeration, structure normalization and compound profiling.

The Informatics Suite is all the software packaged into one integrated suite.

== See also ==
- Cheminformatics
- Bioinformatics
- Business intelligence tools
- Electronic lab notebook
- Visual analytics
- Life Sciences
- Laboratory informatics
