= List of electronic laboratory notebook software packages =

An electronic lab notebook (also known as electronic laboratory notebook, or ELN) is a computer program designed to replace paper laboratory notebooks. Lab notebooks in general are used by scientists, engineers, and technicians to document research, experiments, and procedures performed in a laboratory. A lab notebook is often maintained to be a legal document and may be used in a court of law as evidence. Similar to an inventor's notebook, the lab notebook is also often referred to in patent prosecution and intellectual property litigation.

Electronic lab notebooks are a fairly new technology and offer many benefits to the user as well as organizations. For example: electronic lab notebooks are easier to search upon, simplify data copying and backups, and support collaboration amongst many users. ELNs can have fine-grained access controls, and can be more secure than their paper counterparts. They also allow the direct incorporation of data from instruments, replacing the practice of printing out data to be stapled into a paper notebook. This is a list of ELN software packages. It is incomplete, as a recent review listed 96 active & 76 inactive (172 total) ELN products. Notably, this review and other lists of ELN software often do not include widely used generic notetaking software like Onenote, Notion, Jupyter etc, due to their lack ELN nominal features like time-stamping and append-only editing. Some ELNs are web-based; others are used on premise and a few are available for both environments.

== ELN Software ==
Name	Developer(s)	Initial release	Country of origin	21 CFR Part 11 Compliance Information
Lab Thread	Lab Thread Ltd.	2026	United Kingdom	21 CFR Part 11 compliance available for Pro plans
IGOR - Your Personal Lab Assistant	Wildfell Software, LLC	2023	United States	21 CFR Part 11
OpreX Informatics Manager	Yokogawa Electric	2023	Japan	
ChemExplorer	Labio a.s.	2023	Czech Republic	
CellPort	CellPort Software, LLC	2021	United States	21 CFR Part 11
Colabra	Colabra Inc.	2021	United States	Paid plans
Scispot	Scispot.io Inc.	2021	Canada	
Polar	IDBS	2020	United Kingdom	21 CFR Part 11
Laby	KYLI SAS	2019	France	
Genemod	Genemod, Inc.	2018	United States	21 CFR Part 11
CDD Vault ELN	Collaborative Drug Discovery, Inc.	2018	United States	21 CFR Part 11
Uncountable	Uncountable Inc.	2018	United States	
E-Workbook	IDBS	2017	United Kingdom	21 CFR Part 11
Signals Notebook	Revvity	2017	United States	
Pillar Science	Pillar Science	2017	Canada	
Labii	Labii Inc.	2016	United States	
Chemia ELN	Chemiasoft Pvt ltd	2016	India	[21 CFR Part 11]
Mbook	Mestrelab Research	2015	Spain	
SciNote ELN	By SciNote LLC	2015	United States	
Labstep	Labstep	2015	United Kingdom	
RND NOTE	Cyberline Co., Ltd.	2015	South Korea	
Open Science Framework (OSF)	Center for Open Science	2013	United States	
Labfolder	Labforward GmbH	2012	Germany	
Benchling	Benchling, Inc.	2012	United States	
Labguru	Biodata Ltd	2011	Israel	21 CFR Part 11
Scilligence ELN	Scilligence	2011	United States	
Arxspan ELN	Bruker, Inc.	2011	United States	
SciSure	SciSure	2010	The Netherlands	
LabWare	LabWare ELN	2010	United States	
LabArchives	LabArchives LLC	2009	United States	
Sapio Seamless ELN	Sapio Sciences LLC	2007	United States	
LabVantage 8	LabVantage Solutions, Inc.	2007	United States	
CERF ELN	Lab-Ally LLC	2006	United States	
Logilab ELN	Agaram Technologies	2003	India	
LabCollector	AgileBio	2002	France	

== Open-source ELN software ==
ELN software	Language base	License	Hosted on	Other info
OpenWetWare	PHP	GPL v2 / MIT	Server	
elabFTW	PHP	GNU AGPLv3	Personal computer or server	Developed at Curie Institute, Paris
CFWPELN (Cloneable Free WP ELN)	PHP	GNU General Public License	Personal computer or server	Uses WordPress, developed at University of Houston
OpenBIS	Java, Python	Apache License 2.0	Personal computer or server	Developed at ETH Zürich
Kadi4Mat	Python, VueJS	Apache License 2.0	Personal computer or server	Developed at KIT Karlsruhe
Chemotion ELN	Ruby on Rails	GNU AGPLv3	Personal computer or server	Developed at KIT Karlsruhe
RSpace	Java, JavaScript	GNU AGPLv3	Server	21 CFR Part 11 compliant
SciPeaks	Java, JavaScript	BSD 3-Clause License	Personal computer or server	Developed at Zakodium Sàrl, EPFL Spinoff, Lausanne, Switzerland
