= Scientific Computing & Instrumentation =

Scientific Computing (SC) (formerly Scientific Computing & Instrumentation - SC&I) is a trade publication of Advantage Business Media. It focuses on the scientific applications of computers for automating laboratory and instrument operations. While all aspects of scientific automation are covered, special emphasis is given to the areas of laboratory information management systems (LIMS), laboratory information systems (LIS), chromatography data systems (CDS), and Scientific data management systems (SDMS). It is published monthly, and currently has a global circulation of ~70k, mostly scientific and technical professionals. Subscriptions are free to qualified recipients (those working in the field).

The feature making this publication most useful to those working in the field is its annual supplements, many of which contain detailed vendor responses regarding their systems design. All of these questionnaires are posted on the publication's Web site, along with all articles, focus columns, and vendor submissions. It also provides a focus for vendor advertising, so that those looking to acquire one of these systems will have a starting point for research.

SC has recently started hosting online technical seminars, Web conferences, and expositions.
