= LabLynx =

LabLynx, Inc.
- LabLynx logo
- Company type: Private
- Industry: Laboratory informatics
- Founded: July 24, 2000; 25 years ago
- Founder: John H. Jones
- Headquarters: 2400 Lake Park Drive; Smyrna, Georgia, U.S.
- Area served: Worldwide
- Products: ELab LIMS
- Revenue: $10 to 25 million
- Number of employees: 51–200
- Website: lablynx.com

LabLynx, Inc. is a privately held American laboratory informatics company that develops, supports, and markets laboratory information management system (LIMS) solutions. Its primary offerings over the years have included webLIMS and ELab. The company’s primary clients include laboratories in the agriculture, clinical, environmental, forensics, health care, and manufacturing industries, including government agencies. The company is known for introducing one of the first browser-based LIMS products in 1997 and being in the laboratory informatics industry for decades.

== History ==
Before LabLynx was a company, it was a LIMS product offered by Atlanta Systems Consultants, Inc. (ASC). Formed in 1992, ASC’s LabLynx division later began work on a laboratory information management system designed specifically for a web browser. ASC demonstrated its new Internet Explorer-based LabLynx LIMS at Pittcon in 1997, among the first browser-based LIMS to appear at the time. The company again showcased LabLynx at Pittcon in 1998 and soon after picked up a major LIMS-based contract with the U.S. Customs Service.

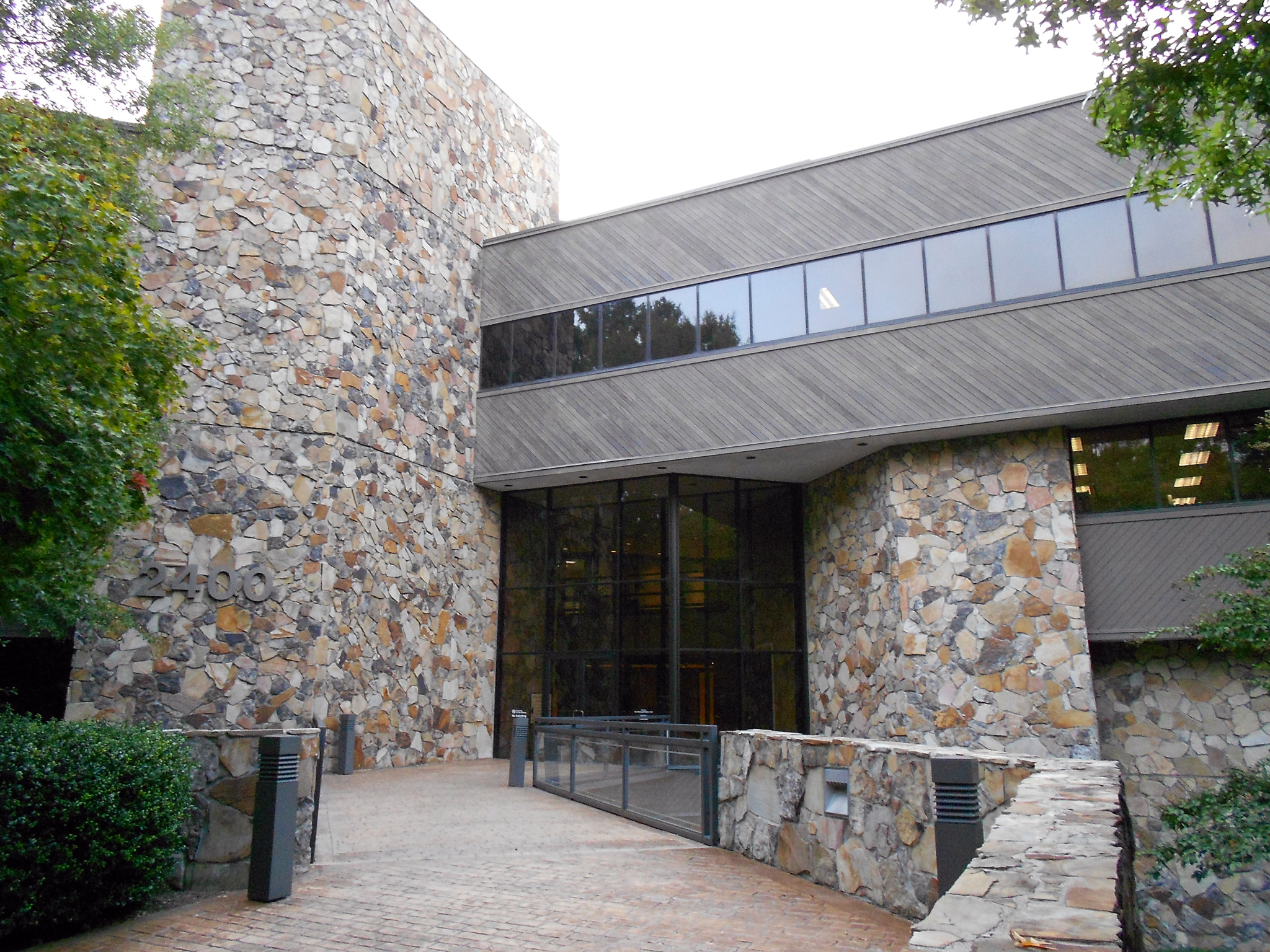
LabLynx home office

By July 2000, the LabLynx division of ASC separated to become its own incorporated entity. And while ASC eventually ceased to exist in 2005, LabLynx, Inc. went on to diversify its offerings. The LabLynx’s browser-based LIMS previously demonstrated at Pittcon in 1997 expanded to become ELab, which in 2001 took on an application service provider (ASP) model of distribution. In 2004 LabLynx released a browser-based tool called openLIMS, which gave consultants and end-users the ability "to build custom LIMS solutions that are geared to the exact operational needs of many different laboratories."

On June 19, 2006, LabLynx established the Laboratory Informatics Institute, an open membership group with the purpose of advancing the field of laboratory informatics and shaping the standards associated with it.

In 2011, LabLynx was involved in an initiative to standardize and structure the transmission of laboratory data that first originates in a LIMS or LIS and then moves to a person's or population of people's electronic health records. This laboratory results interface (LRI) pilot began in August 2011 and included collaborations with the supported open source project mdDigest and the U.S. Office of the National Coordinator for Health Information Technology (ONC).

In February 2015, LabLynx released HealthCloudPOL, a cloud-based laboratory information system (LIS) for the physician office laboratory (POL).

In July 2019, LabLynx released its CannaQA LIMS software for the cannabis testing industry. The solution's name changed to "ELab LIMS for Cannabis Testing" by 2022.

In April 2020, LabLynx announced it had modified its existing ELab LIMS platform to effectively manage COVID-19 workflows.

=== Community history ===
Since transitioning from Atlanta Systems Consultants, Inc. to LabLynx, Inc. in 2000, LabLynx has become increasingly active in the laboratory informatics community. Projects that LabLynx has started or been involved in within the community (past and present) include:

- the Laboratory Informatics Institute, an open trade association with the mission of educating, standardizing, and promoting the laboratory informatics industry
- LIMSfinder, an online interactive magazine released by the Laboratory Informatics Institute
- LIMSbook, a LIMS buyer’s guide released by the Laboratory Informatics Institute
- LIMSforum, a community-driven discussion group created to facilitate the exchange of ideas and technical information across the fields of laboratory, science, and health informatics
- LIMSwiki, a Creative Commons-licensed wiki with the goal of bringing related informatics communities together to maintain a repository of information about the industry

== Products ==
LabLynx products include:

- ELab LIMS, a configurable cloud-based LIMS serving multiple industries

Prior products include:

- webLIMS, a hosted LIMS software package based on the "software as a service" (SaaS) model of distribution
- HealthCloudPOL, a cloud-based laboratory information system (LIS) for the physician office laboratory (POL), introduced by the company in early 2015
- CannaQA LIMS, a LIMS for the analytical testing of cannabis (now part of ELab)
- CovidLIMS, a platform-based LIMS/LIS for COVID-19 diagnostic testing
