= Sapio =

Sapio may refer to:

- Sapio Sciences, an American technology company
- Francesca De Sapio (born 1945), Italian actress and acting coach
- Carmine DeSapio (1908 – 2004), American politician

== See also ==
- Sapo
