= Collaborative Drug Discovery =

Collaborative Drug Discovery, Inc.
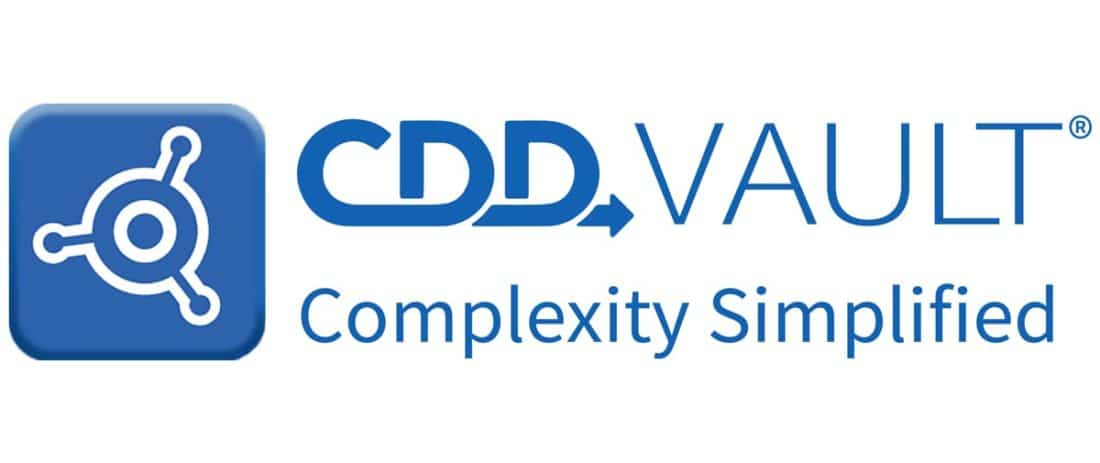
- Type: Private
- Industry: Life Sciences; Informatics; ELN; Pharma Intelligence
- Founded: 2004; 22 years ago
- Headquarters: Burlingame, California, U.S.
- Products: CDD Vault; PharmaKB; CDD Public
- Website: collaborativedrug.com

Collaborative Drug Discovery (CDD) is a software company founded in 2004 as a spin-out of Eli Lilly by Barry Bunin, PhD. CDD utilizes a web-based database solution for managing drug discovery data, primarily through the CDD Vault product which is focused around small molecules and associated bio-assay data. In 2021, CDD launched its first commercial data offering, PharmaKB, formerly BioHarmony, as The Pharma KnowledgeBase, which is centered around pharma company, drug, and disease information for research, business intelligence, and investors.

== Products ==
1. CDD Vault is a research informatics web platform by Collaborative Drug Discovery. It contains several modules for collaborative project teams to manage, analyze, and share both private & public data. It is used by biotech companies, CROs, academic labs, research hospitals, agrochemical and consumer goods companies. CDD Vault is a modern web application for chemical registration, assay data management, and SAR analysis. It is designed to be simple to use and extremely secure.

CDD Vault modules	Type	Description
Registration	Chemical registration system	Web application within CDD Vault for chemical and biological registration, assay data management, and SAR analysis.
Activity	Experimental data	Web application within CDD Vault for managing and analyzing experimental data associated with registered entities, and generating reports.
Visualization	Scientific visualization	Web application within CDD Vault allowing plotting and analysis of large data sets to find interesting patterns, activity hotspots, and outliers.
Assays	Bioinformatics	Web application within CDD Vault for Assay Informatics to allow for easy registration, search, and systematic comparison of assays using standardized protocols and runtime details.
ELN	Electronic lab notebook	Web application within CDD Vault that integrates a full analysis and visualization environment with chemical and biological assay data repositories.
Inventory	Inventory management software	Web application integrated within CDD Vault for tracking the supply and location of compounds and reagents.
Curves	Curve fitting	Web application integrated within CDD Vault to generate, QC, and analyze results such as IC50, pIC50, EC50.
AI	Artificial intelligence in pharmacy	Web application within CDD Vault for Artificial Intelligence (AI) capabilities such as identifying similar compounds, synthesizable molecules, bioisosteric suggestions, and patent issues.
Automation	API, Data mapping	Web application within CDD Vault to connect data through an API, Parser, and Mapping Tools.
CDD Public	Chemical database	Free database also integrated within CDD Vault for fostering open collaboration containing over 3 million molecules accessible to everyone in the drug discovery community.

2. PharmaKB is a knowledgebase for pharma-related information. Available data spans (preclinical, clinical, financial, patents, and post-approval) information about companies, drugs, and diseases. It is designed to be used by researchers, those practicing business intelligence, and investors. PharmaKB also offers real-time updates with a subscription model instead of static reports. As a throwback to CDD Vault's slogan of "Complexity Simplified", PharmaKB uses the slogan of "Data Simplified" and promotes a data trilogy of Company, Drug, and Disease. The product is meant to expand the company's scope from working with mostly preclinical researchers to being relevant for clinical and post-approval stages of drug development, including: Pharmacovigilance or Drug Safety, Regulatory Affairs, Competitive Intelligence - also referred to as Pharma Intelligence within its industry, and Pharmacoeconomics as well as investors and publishers of medical content.

== Collaborations ==
The capability for inter-group collaboration attracted attention from the Bill & Melinda Gates Foundation, who in 2008 awarded CDD with a two million dollar grant being used to support researchers combating tuberculosis.

In 2010, GlaxoSmithKline released 13,471 molecules screened for activity against malaria to the public. These molecules and their associated screening data are available via CDD Public, as well in as the National Library of Medicine's PubChem and the European Bioinformatics Institute's ChEMBL database. This data has served as the basis for several cheminformatics analyses.

In February 2011 CDD began participating in the collaborative MM4TB project led by Stewart Cole and including participants from AstraZeneca and Sanofi Aventis.

== The CDD Book ==
Inside CDD Vault: A Different Kind of Silicon Valley Success Story is a 2025 non-fiction book by Barry Bunin, founder of Collaborative Drug Discovery.

The book describes the development of Collaborative Drug Discovery and its software platform, CDD Vault, through accounts from employees, collaborators, and scientists associated with the organization. It focuses on the human and organizational aspects of building a life sciences software company and supporting collaborative approaches to drug discovery.

=== Reception ===
The book was reviewed by Drug Discovery World, which described it as an account emphasizing the human side of scientific software development and collaborative approaches to drug discovery.

== See also ==
- Collaborative software
- List of electronic laboratory notebook software packages
- Cheminformatics toolkits
