= Endress+Hauser =

German instrumentation and process automation company

- Type: Private
- Industry: Instrumentation, Process Automation
- Founded: 1953; 73 years ago
- Headquarters: Reinach, Basel-Country, Switzerland.
- Area served: Worldwide
- Key people: Georg H. Endress (Co-Founder of Endress+Hauser); Ludwig Hauser (Co-Founder of Endress+Hauser); Peter Selders (CEO, Endress+Hauser AG); Matthias Altendorf (Chairman of the Supervisory board)
- Products: Instrumentation
- Revenue: €3.72bn (2023)
- Net income: €408.74M (2023)
- Number of employees: 16,532 (2023)
- Website: www.endress.com/en

Endress+Hauser (Endress and Hauser) is a Swiss-based globally operating process and laboratory instrumentation and automation supplier.

In 2023, the family-owned business employed over 16,500 people and generated revenue of €3.72 billion. In the field of measurement technology, the group is regarded as a global market leader.

== Company structure ==
The Endress+Hauser group, based in Reinach near Basel, consists of 129 companies in 54 countries.

The group's parent company is Endress+Hauser AG in Reinach, Switzerland: a stock corporation under Swiss law whose shares are not listed on a stock exchange. The Endress+Hauser Management AG, based in Reinach, manages and coordinates the group.

The families of the descendants of the founding couple each hold 12% of the company. The remaining 4% is owned by the Georg H. Endress Foundation. Peter Selders is Chief executive officer. Matthias Altendorf is chairman of the Supervisory board. The Endress family is represented on the board by Steven Endress and Sandra Genge, grandchildren of the founder.

In the financial year 2023, the group achieved a revenue of €3.72 billion and employed over 16,500 people. Approximately 7% of the annual revenue is invested in research and development, resulting in between 200 and 300 new patents each year. Overall, Endress+Hauser holds nearly 9,000 patents.

=== Subsidiaries and Locations ===
The subsidiaries of the Endress+Hauser Group operate as legally independent entities. Endress+Hauser provides sales and support in 125 countries and manufactures in the major economic regions. The company operates production facilities in Brazil, China, Czech Republic, Germany, France, India, Italy, Japan, Switzerland, the United Kingdom, and the United States.

Endress+Hauser Level+Pressure manufactures pressure and level measurement devices that are used in various applications, including the pharmaceutical industry. Endress+Hauser Flow produces precision tools for flow technology. Its devices measure liquids and gases and are primarily utilized in the chemical industry as well as in the life sciences sector.

Endress+Hauser Liquid Analysis offers sensors and complete systems for liquid analysis. Endress+Hauser Temperature+System Products markets products related to temperature measurement technology.

Endress+Hauser Optical Analysis operates in the United States and was formed from the merger of American companies Kaiser Optical Systems and Spectra Sensors. It provides optical analysis devices in the fields of Raman and TDLAS spectroscopy.

Through Endress+Hauser Digital Solutions, digitalization measures for the corporate group are implemented.

Furthermore, in 2024, Endress+Hauser signed a strategic partnership in process automation with Sick AG, a sensor manufacturer based in Waldkirch, Germany. Starting in 2025, Endress+Hauser will take over global sales of Sick's process analyzers and gas flow measurement devices. A joint venture is planned for the production and development of process devices.

=== Memberships ===
Endress+Hauser is a member of the Association of Industrial Companies in Baden and the Association of Electrical and Digital Industries. Additionally, Georg Endress founded the Biovalley network, which is a collaboration of biotechnology companies and universities in the tri-border area along the Upper Rhine.

== Products, services, customers ==
Endress+Hauser offers products, technologies, and services for the process engineering industry. The business areas are divided into process technology, laboratory measurement technology, and sensors.

The process technology sector under the Endress+Hauser brand includes automation and encompasses the development of products, technologies, and services for flow, level, pressure, and temperature measurement, as well as the analysis of liquids, gases, and solids. The products and technologies are primarily used by clients in the chemical, food and beverage, water and wastewater, oil and gas, life sciences, power and energy, mining, minerals, and metals industries.

In the laboratory measurement technology sector, analytical instruments and bioanalytical systems are marketed under the Analytik Jena brand, serving science and research clients. Through Innovative Sensor Technology IST AG (IST), physical, chemical, and biological sensors as well as sensor modules are developed, produced, and distributed for various applications.

Endress+Hauser is considered a leading provider of measuring points and complete systems for liquid analysis. The corporate group delivers around three million sensors and systems annually.

== History ==
=== Foundation and beginnings ===
The company was founded as L Hauser KG on 1 February 1953 by Swiss engineer Georg H Endress (1924–2008) and German banker Ludwig Hauser (1895–1975). Starting capital was a modest 2,000 Deutsche Mark; the first ‘operating facility’ was a room in Hauser's apartment in Lörrach, Germany. The business has been trading under the name Endress+Hauser since 1957.

In the beginning, the company sold level instruments produced by the British company Fielden Electronics. Soon after, Georg H Endress started to develop his own devices. In 1955, he registered his first patent and set up a production facility. The company broadened its offerings by incorporating new measurement principles and explored business opportunities in additional countries.

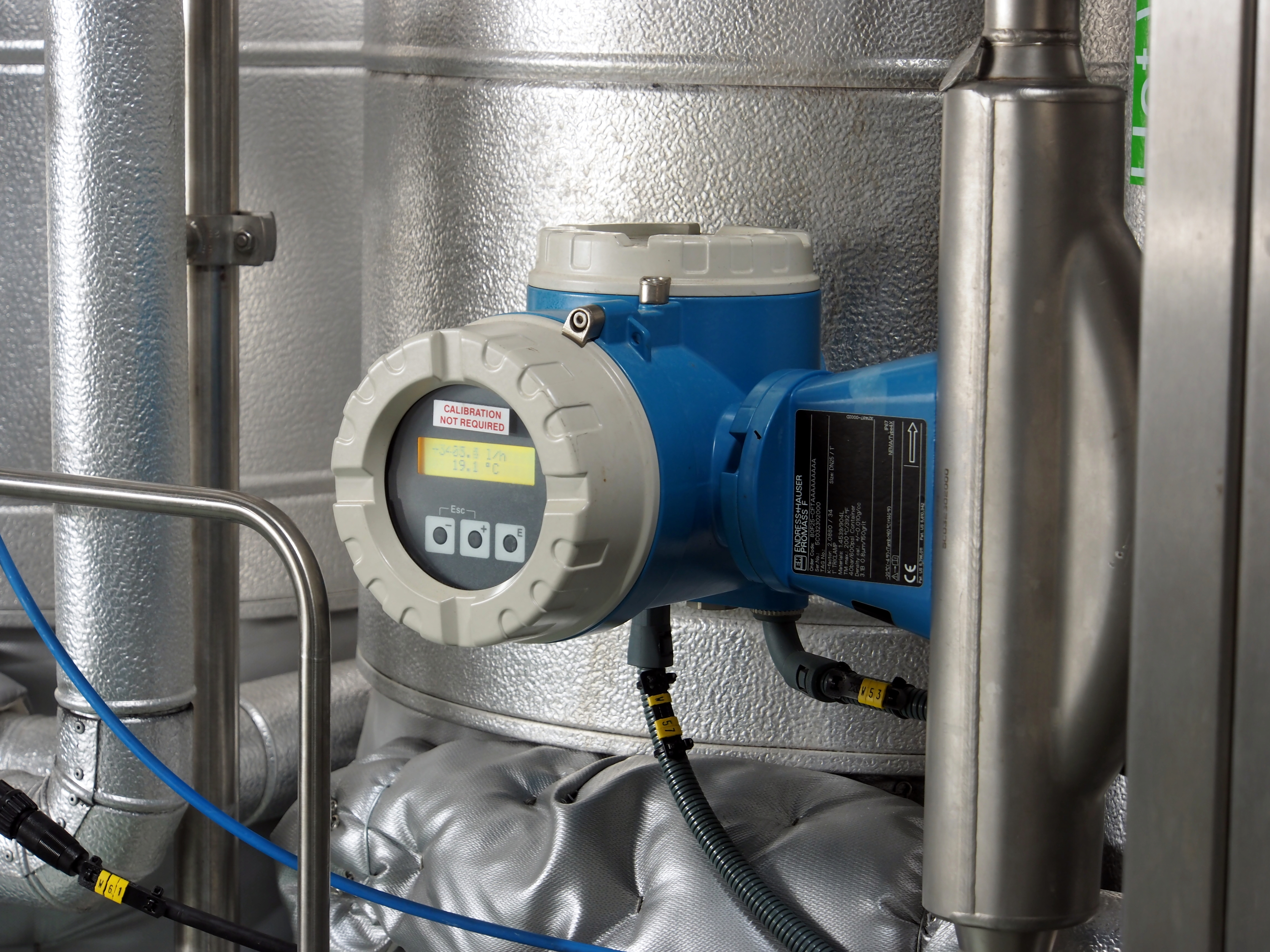
An Endress+Hauser Promass F Flow meter.

The first foreign subsidiary was established in 1960 in the Netherlands.

In 1968, a holding company was registered in Switzerland. In 1970, Endress+Hauser entered the US and Japanese markets.

=== Family ownership of the Endress family and generational transition ===
In 1975, co-founder Ludwig Hauser died; the Endress family became sole shareholder. In the following years, the company expanded through acquisitions and start-ups.

In 1977, Endress+Hauser Flowtec AG was founded at the headquarters in Reinach, as a development center for the flow measurement business area. Among the first products were magnetic inductive flowmeters.

Measurement value recording and liquid analysis were added as other fields of activity, followed later by pressure and temperature measurement technologies.

In 1979, Klaus Endress, the son of the founder, joined the company. In 1995, he took over the position as the group's CEO from his father and company founder, Georg Endress. By that time, Endress+Hauser had grown into a global company with 4,339 employees and generated revenue of CHF 679.6 million.

=== Expansion from 1996 onwards. ===
In 1997, Innovative Sensors Inc. (ISI), a manufacturer of sensors for water analysis, was acquired. Prior to the acquisition, Endress+Hauser had already collaborated with ISI for over 19 years.

At the beginning of the 2000s, production facilities in Germany and Switzerland were expanded, particularly at the locations in Reinach, Cernay, and Maulburg. Several German companies were also acquired, including Exner Anlagebau GmbH & Co. KG and Dr. Staiger Mohilo Analysenmesstechnik GmbH & Co.

In addition, in 2000, the company expanded into India with a flow meter production facility in Aurangabad. In 2001, shares were acquired in the American analytical measurement technology company Wedgewood Technology Inc. Shares were also acquired in the Finnish company Satron Instruments, a manufacturer of measuring devices and fittings for the paper and pulp industry.

In 2002, the corporate group recorded losses in revenue for the first time. The reason for this was the insolvency of the subsidiary Photo Print Electronic. However, the loss did not hinder the company's growth, and in 2008, the corporate group achieved a revenue of over €1 billion for the first time.

In 2005, Endress+Hauser acquired Innovative Sensor Technology IST AG, a Swiss-based provider of physical, chemical and biological sensors with operations in Ebnat-Kappel, Switzerland, and Roznov, Czech Republic.

In 2008, Georg H Endress died. During his lifetime, the shareholder family had created a family charter, which states, “Endress+Hauser shall remain a family company oriented toward sustainable success.”

In early 2010, Endress+Hauser opened a new production facility for flow measurement technology as well as level and pressure measurement technology in India. From this location, not only the Indian market but also countries such as Singapore, Japan, and Thailand were supplied directly.

Endress+Hauser also expanded in the US market. In 2012, Spectra Sensors Inc., based in Houston, Texas, was acquired. Spectra Sensors is a manufacturer of optical gas sensors.

In 2013, Endress+Hauser entered the laboratory instrumentation business with the acquisition of German company Analytik Jena AG. Additional takeovers (Kaiser Optical Systems Inc., SensAction AG) strengthened the segment of process analysis and measurement of quality parameters. Besides this strategic focal point, the issue of digitalization was another major factor of influence in company development. By 2014, Endress+Hauser increased its stake in Analytik Jena to 82.22%. A year later, a branch of Analytik Jena was opened in Reinach. The acquisition of Analytik Jena was completed in March 2016, after the remaining shares were acquired. At that time, it was considered the largest acquisition in the company's history, with a purchase price of around €100 million. Prior to this, only smaller companies had typically been acquired. In 2018, shareholders of Analytik Jena AG sued over the stock price as compensation and demanded a higher cash settlement for the transfer of shares. However, the Gera District Court ruled that the price set by Endress+Hauser was justified.

On 1 January 2014, Matthias Altendorf took over as CEO of the Endress+Hauser Group from Klaus Endress, who became president of the supervisory board. At that time, the company generated revenue of €1.814 billion and employed 11,919 staff worldwide. Although not a member of the family, Altendorf had already been with the company for over 25 years at that time. With his appointment as CEO, Altendorf announced the intention to further develop the field of laboratory and process analysis.

In the same year, sales companies were also established in the United Arab Emirates and Algeria.

=== Growth and developments since 2017 ===
In 2017, the group acquired Blue Ocean Nova AG, a manufacturer of inline spectrometers for monitoring quality-relevant process parameters. In 2018, a calibration and training center was opened in Al-Dschubail, Saudi Arabia.

From 2018/19 onwards, Endress+Hauser significantly increased its investments in the expansion of the group. Over a period of five years, approximately €0.5 billion were invested. This included expansions of the headquarters in Reinach, the production site in Maulburg, as well as international locations in the United States and China.

During the COVID-19 pandemic in 2020, Endress+Hauser's revenue decreased by 2.8% to €2.6 billion. Due to the diverse industries, segments, and countries served by the group, the impact of the pandemic was less severe than for other companies. Reduced working hours were largely avoided, and employees were not laid off as a result of the pandemic.

Following Russia's invasion of Ukraine in 2022, Endress+Hauser ceased operations in Russia and withdrew from the Russian market.

At the turn of 2023/24, Klaus Endress stepped down from his active role in the company due to his age and resigned from the supervisory board but remained chairman of the family council. Matthias Altendorf transitioned to the group's supervisory board and handed over management to Peter Selders, who had previously led the company's competence center for level and pressure measurement technology.

== Awards ==
- 2004: Ludwig Erhard Prize for Endress+Hauser Wetzer, presented by the Ludwig Erhard Foundation
- 2009: Award for innovative environmental protection for Endress+Hauser Conducta, presented by Deutsche Bank and the Standortinitiative Deutschland – Land der Ideen
- 2016: Company of the Year, awarded by Frost & Sullivan
- 2018: Hermes Award for Endress+Hauser Messtechnik, presented at the Hannover Messe
- 2023: Recognised as one of Switzerland's most innovative companies, awarded by the Swiss business magazines Bilanz, PME, and Statista
