= Sapio Sciences =

US technology company

Sapio Sciences LLC
- Industry: Life Sciences, Biopharma R&D, Clinical Diagnostics, Pharmaceutical manufacturing
- Founded: 2004; 22 years ago
- Headquarters: Baltimore, MD, United States
- Key people: Kevin Cramer (Founder & CEO), Gordon McCall (Chief Operating Officer), Mike Hampton (Chief Commercial Officer), Rob Brown, Ph.D. (Global Vice President and Head of the Scientific Office)
- Products: Lab Informatics Platform, Laboratory Information Management, Electronic Lab Notebook, Scientific Data Management
- Website: www.sapiosciences.com

Sapio Sciences is a software company that provides laboratory informatics solutions, including Laboratory Information Management Systems (LIMS), Electronic Lab Notebook (ELN), and Scientific Data Management Systems (SDMS).

Founded by Kevin Cramer in 2004, the company serves clients in biotechnology, pharmaceuticals, clinical and molecular diagnostics, and related scientific research fields. Sapio's platform supports lab automation, data integration, and workflow management across the research, development, and manufacturing lifecycle.

Kevin Cramer has a background in Information Systems from York College, PA. He has co-authored multiple papers in Nature Genetics, applying statistical and machine learning methodologies to genetic data interpretation.

== History ==
=== Early Development (2004–2012): From Genotyping to Informatics ===
Founded in 2004 by Kevin Cramer in Baltimore, Maryland, Sapio Sciences initially focused on developing software tools to support genotyping and Genome-Wide Association Studies (GWAS). Its first major product, Exemplar Analytics, integrated over 50 algorithms for complex genetic data analysis. In 2007, responding to customer demand, Sapio released Exemplar LIMS, marking its entry into laboratory informatics.

=== Platform Expansion (2013–2019): Unifying Laboratory Workflows ===
In 2013, Sapio launched Web Client 1.0, enhancing accessibility and usability. By 2017, it became the first company to integrate a full-featured, web-based Electronic Lab Notebook (ELN) with its LIMS on a unified software platform, streamlining laboratory operations across disciplines.

=== Strategic Growth (2020–2023): Platform Modernization and Private Equity Investment ===
In 2020, Sapio launched a new Sapio Platform that extended its core platform with additional modules for data analysis and knowledge extraction and expanded its capabilities with templated applications for next-generation sequencing (NGS), bioanalysis, clinical diagnostics, and biomanufacturing.

In December 2022, GHO Capital Partners, a European private equity firm specializing in healthcare investments, invested in Sapio Sciences. This strategic partnership aims to support international expansion and deepen product innovation.

=== Recent Innovations (2023–Present): AI Integration, Major Clients, and Partner Ecosystem Expansion ===
In 2023, Sapio introduced ELaiN (Electronic Lab Artificially Intelligent Notebook), the first AI-powered assistant natively embedded in an ELN. That same year, organizations such as NatureMetrics, Oxford Biomedica, and Immunebridge selected Sapio's platform for applications ranging from environmental DNA sequencing to NK cell therapy research and cell and gene therapy development.

In 2024, Sapio was awarded full GxP validation of its lab informatics platform, and launched its GMP LIMS to support compliant biomanufacturing workflows, followed by the release of Electronic Batch Record (EBR) capabilities in October 2024 to streamline batch traceability and compliance. During this period, the company also expanded the Sapio Sciences Partner Program, welcoming integrators such as Zifo, Excelra, CSols Inc., Astrix, EPAM, and Cognitive Networks, further strengthening its global delivery ecosystem.

Also in 2024, Sapio deepened its collaboration with Amazon Web Services (AWS), integrating AWS Bedrock into the Sapio Platform in November 2024. This enabled secure access to advanced generative AI models, allowing users to interact with the platform through natural language, configure workflows, automate experiment generation, and engage with AI-powered chatbots, significantly enhancing user experience and accelerating scientific discovery.

In 2025, Sapio integrated NVIDIA's BioNeMo platform into its Lab Informatics Platform in March 2025, enabling seamless use of AI-native tools for drug discovery directly within the ELN. This integration supports applications like molecule generation, protein structure prediction, and AI-enhanced docking simulations, empowering researchers to streamline in silico workflows and enhance decision-making.

Sapio also launched Release 25.4 of its platform, introducing a comprehensive Biorepository Management Solution for compliant sample tracking and streamlined biospecimen management.

Additionally, three major clients adopted Sapio's platform in early 2025: Schrödinger, for enhanced in silico drug discovery spanning from plasmid to protein structure; LabConnect, to modernize lab operations and improve data flow across global CRO services; and Jenssen R&D, to automate high-throughput RP-HPLC-MS and SFC-MS analytical and purification platforms to support drug discovery.

These deployments underscore Sapio's growing role in supporting AI-driven and highly regulated scientific workflows.

== Operations ==
Sapio Sciences is a privately held company headquartered in Baltimore, Maryland, with offices in York, Pennsylvania; Fort Lauderdale, Florida; and London, United Kingdom. The company serves a global clientele across pharmaceutical, biotechnology, diagnostics, and clinical research sectors.

The company's unified lab informatics platform encompasses Laboratory Information Management Systems (LIMS), Electronic Lab Notebooks (ELN), and Scientific Data Management Systems (SDMS). This cloud-native, low-code/no-code solution is designed for rapid deployment, user configurability, and scalability across research and regulated environments.

Sapio Sciences is led by founder and CEO Kevin Cramer. As of 2025, the leadership team includes Gordon McCall (Chief Operating Officer), Mike Hampton (Chief Commercial Officer), and Rob Brown, Ph.D. (Global Vice President and Head of the Scientific Office). Rob Brown's role focuses on developing AI-powered, scientist-centric solutions to streamline workflows in biopharma R&D, clinical diagnostics, and pharmaceutical manufacturing.

In December 2022, GHO Capital Partners, a European specialist investor in global healthcare, invested in Sapio Sciences, supporting Sapio's international expansion, particularly in Europe, and accelerating innovation in AI-assisted lab informatics technologies.

Sapio maintains certifications such as SOC 2 Type 2 and HIPAA/HITECH (completed August 2024) and HDS (Hébergeur de Données de Santé) Certification (achieved January 2025). Its platform complies with FDA 21 CFR Part 11, EU Annex 11, and other Good Practice (GxP) requirements.

The company supports its customers through a global partner program and an ecosystem of systems integrators, contract research organizations (CROs), and consulting firms. This includes partnerships with firms like Excelra, CSols Inc., Astrix, EPAM, and Cognitive Networks. Sapio's customer success model encompasses dedicated onboarding, regulatory validation support, and lifecycle optimization to align software deployments with scientific and operational outcomes.

== Products ==
Sapio Sciences offers a unified lab informatics platform that combines three core components:

- Laboratory Information Management System (LIMS): Enables end-to-end automation of lab workflows, including sample and materials tracking, batch processing, audit trails, and compliance with regulatory standards such as FDA 21 CFR Part 11 and EU Annex 11.
- Electronic Lab Notebook (ELN): Provides scientists with an interactive, digital environment to document experiments, collaborate in real time, and standardize protocols. Features include reusable experiment templates, molecular biology design tools, and embedded AI assistance for configuration and data analysis.
- Scientific Data Cloud (SDMS): Centralizes and harmonizes data from instruments and third-party systems into a FAIR-compliant (Findable, Accessible, Interoperable, Reusable) knowledge graph. This system supports advanced search, visualization, and integration with AI/machine learning tools.

All components are built on a single, cloud-native, no-code/low-code platform. This enables scientific teams to design and manage their own workflows without developer support. The platform includes ELaiN, an AI-powered scientific assistant, which allows users to configure workflows, interpret data, and automate tasks using natural language commands.

=== Modular Solutions by Sector ===
Sapio's platform includes preconfigured modules tailored to meet the specific needs of key scientific sectors:

- Biopharma R&D: Supports research in molecular biology, NGS, multimodal and antibody discovery, in vivo studies, histopathology, flow cytometry, and immunogenicity. Built-in tools include CRISPR and plasmid design, PCR setup, and full sample and inventory tracking.
- Clinical and Diagnostics: Designed for diagnostics workflows, including NGS-based testing and clinical data management. Features include HL7 integration, result reporting, and secure physician portals. The system supports compliance with CLIA, CAP, and other regulatory standards.
- Manufacturing and Quality: Offers a GMP-compliant LIMS with modules for environmental monitoring, stability studies, QC testing, and electronic batch records. These solutions are designed to maintain compliance while streamlining quality oversight and production workflows.

This modular architecture allows organizations to tailor the platform to their operational needs while maintaining data continuity, regulatory alignment, and scientific context across functions.
