= Elab =

Elab or ELAB may refer to:

- Elab, Palau, a village
- ElabFTW, web application
- 2019 Hong Kong extradition bill
