= Chemist =

Scientist trained in the study of chemistry

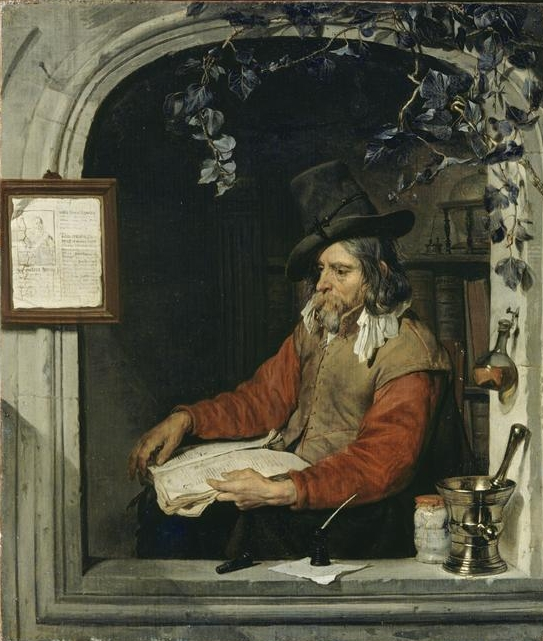
The Apothecary or The Chemist, a portrait by Gabriël Metsu, c. 1651–67

A chemist (from Greek chēm(ía) alchemy; replacing chymist from Medieval Latin alchemist) is a graduated scientist trained in the study of chemistry, or an officially enrolled student in the field. Chemists study the composition of matter and its properties. Chemists carefully describe the properties they study in terms of quantities, with detail on the level of molecules and their component atoms. Chemists carefully measure substance proportions, chemical reaction rates, and other chemical properties. In Commonwealth English, pharmacists are often called chemists.

Chemists use their knowledge to learn the composition and properties of unfamiliar substances, as well as to reproduce and synthesize large quantities of useful naturally occurring substances and create new artificial substances and useful processes. Chemists may specialize in any number of subdisciplines of chemistry. Materials scientists and metallurgists share much of the same education and skills with chemists. The work of chemists is often related to the work of chemical engineers, who are primarily concerned with the proper design, construction and evaluation of the most cost-effective large-scale chemical plants and work closely with industrial chemists on the development of new processes and methods for the commercial-scale manufacture of chemicals and related products.

== History of chemistry ==
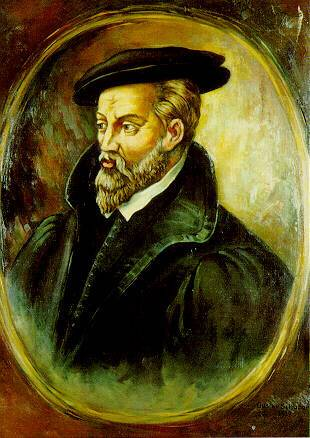
German chemist Georgius Agricola (1494–1555) was the first to drop the Arabic definite article al-, exclusively writing chymia and chymista in describing activity that we today would characterize as chemical or alchemical.

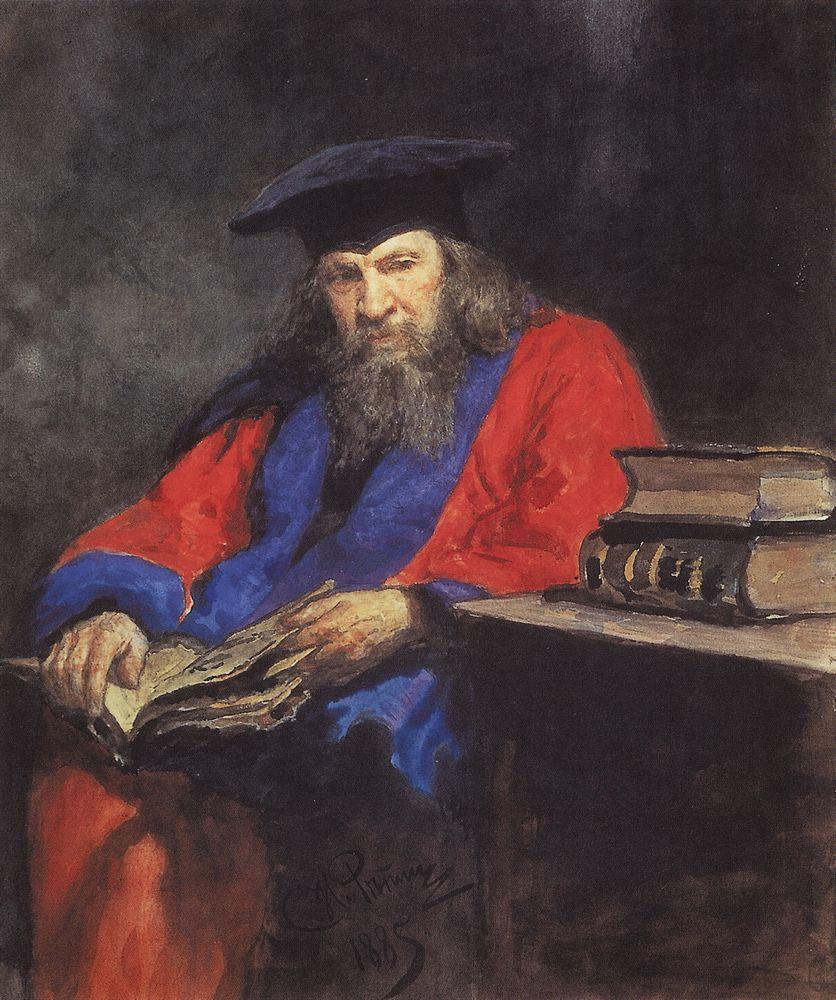
Russian chemist Dmitri Mendeleev, author of the first modern periodic table of elements

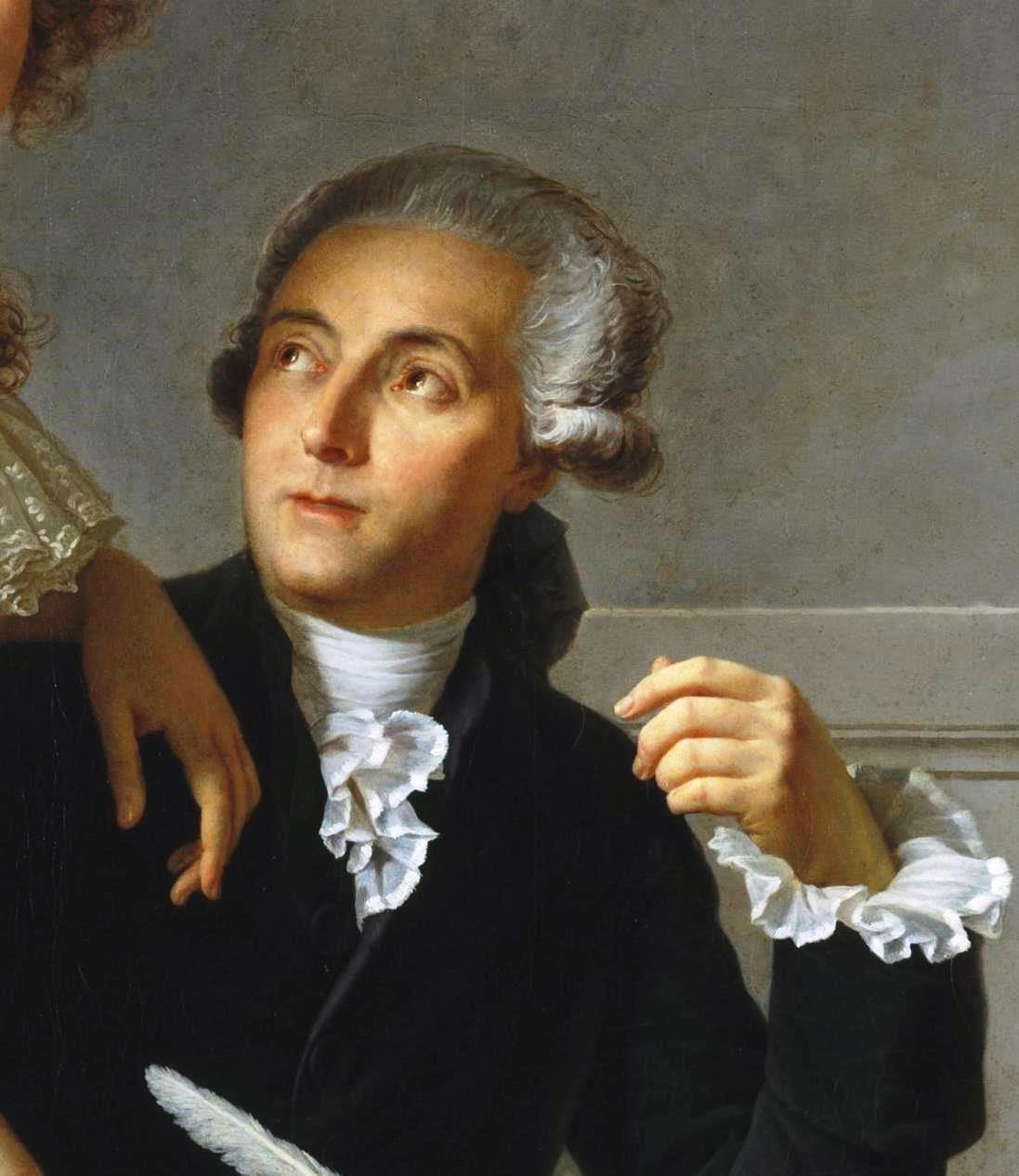
Antoine Lavoisier (1743–94) is considered the "Father of Modern Chemistry".

The roots of chemistry can be traced to the phenomenon of burning. Fire was a mystical force that transformed one substance into another and thus was of primary interest to mankind. It was fire that led to the discovery of iron and glasses. After gold was discovered and became a precious metal, many people were interested to find a method that could convert other substances into gold. This led to the protoscience called alchemy. The word chemist is derived from the Neo-Latin noun chimista, an abbreviation of alchimista (alchemist). Alchemists discovered many chemical processes that led to the development of modern chemistry.

Chemistry as we know it today was invented by Antoine Lavoisier with his law of conservation of mass in 1783. The discoveries of the chemical elements has a long history culminating in the creation of the periodic table by Dmitri Mendeleev. The Nobel Prize in Chemistry created in 1901 gives an overview of chemical discovery since the start of the 20th century.

At the Washington Academy of Sciences during World War I, it was said that the side with the best chemists would win the war.

== Education ==
=== Formal education ===
Jobs for chemists generally require at least a bachelor's degree in chemistry, which takes four years. However, many positions, especially those in research, require a Master of Science or a Doctor of Philosophy (PhD.). Most undergraduate programs emphasize mathematics and physics as well as chemistry, partly because chemistry is also known as "the central science", thus chemists ought to have a well-rounded knowledge about science. At the Master's level and higher, students tend to specialize in a particular field. Fields of specialization include biochemistry, nuclear chemistry, organic chemistry, inorganic chemistry, polymer chemistry, analytical chemistry, physical chemistry, theoretical chemistry, quantum chemistry, environmental chemistry, and thermochemistry. Postdoctoral experience may be required for certain positions.

Workers whose work involves chemistry, but not at a complexity requiring an education with a chemistry degree, are commonly referred to as chemical technicians. Such technicians commonly do such work as simpler, routine analyses for quality control or in clinical laboratories, having an associate degree. A chemical technologist has more education or experience than a chemical technician but less than a chemist, often having a bachelor's degree in a different field of science with also an associate degree in chemistry (or many credits related to chemistry) or having the same education as a chemical technician but more experience. There are also degrees specific to become a chemical technologist, which are somewhat distinct from those required when a student is interested in becoming a professional chemist. A chemical technologist is more involved in the management and operation of the equipment and instrumentation necessary to perform chemical analysis than a chemical technician. They are part of the team of a chemical laboratory in which the quality of the raw material, intermediate products and finished products are analyzed. They also perform functions in the areas of environmental quality control and the operational phase of a chemical plant.

=== Training ===
In addition to all the training usually given to chemical technologists in their respective degree (or one given via an associate degree), a chemist is also trained to understand more details related to chemical phenomena so that the chemist can be capable of more planning on the steps to achieve a distinct goal through a chemistry-related endeavor. The higher the competency level achieved in the field of chemistry (as assessed via a combination of education, experience and personal achievements), the higher the responsibility given to that chemist and the more complicated the task might be. Chemistry, as a field, has so many applications that different tasks and objectives can be given to workers or scientists with these different levels of education or experience. The specific title of each job varies from position to position, depending on factors such as the kind of industry, the routine level of the task, the current needs of a particular enterprise, the size of the enterprise or hiring firm, the philosophy and management principles of the hiring firm, the visibility of the competency and individual achievements of the one seeking employment, economic factors such as recession or economic depression, among others. This makes it difficult to categorize the exact roles of these chemistry-related workers as standard for a given level of education. Since these factors affect exact job titles with distinct responsibilities, some chemists might begin doing technician tasks while other chemists might begin doing more complicated tasks than those of a technician, such as tasks that also involve formal applied research, management, or supervision included within the responsibilities of that same job title. The level of supervision given to that chemist also varies in a similar manner, with factors similar to those that affect the tasks demanded for a particular chemist.

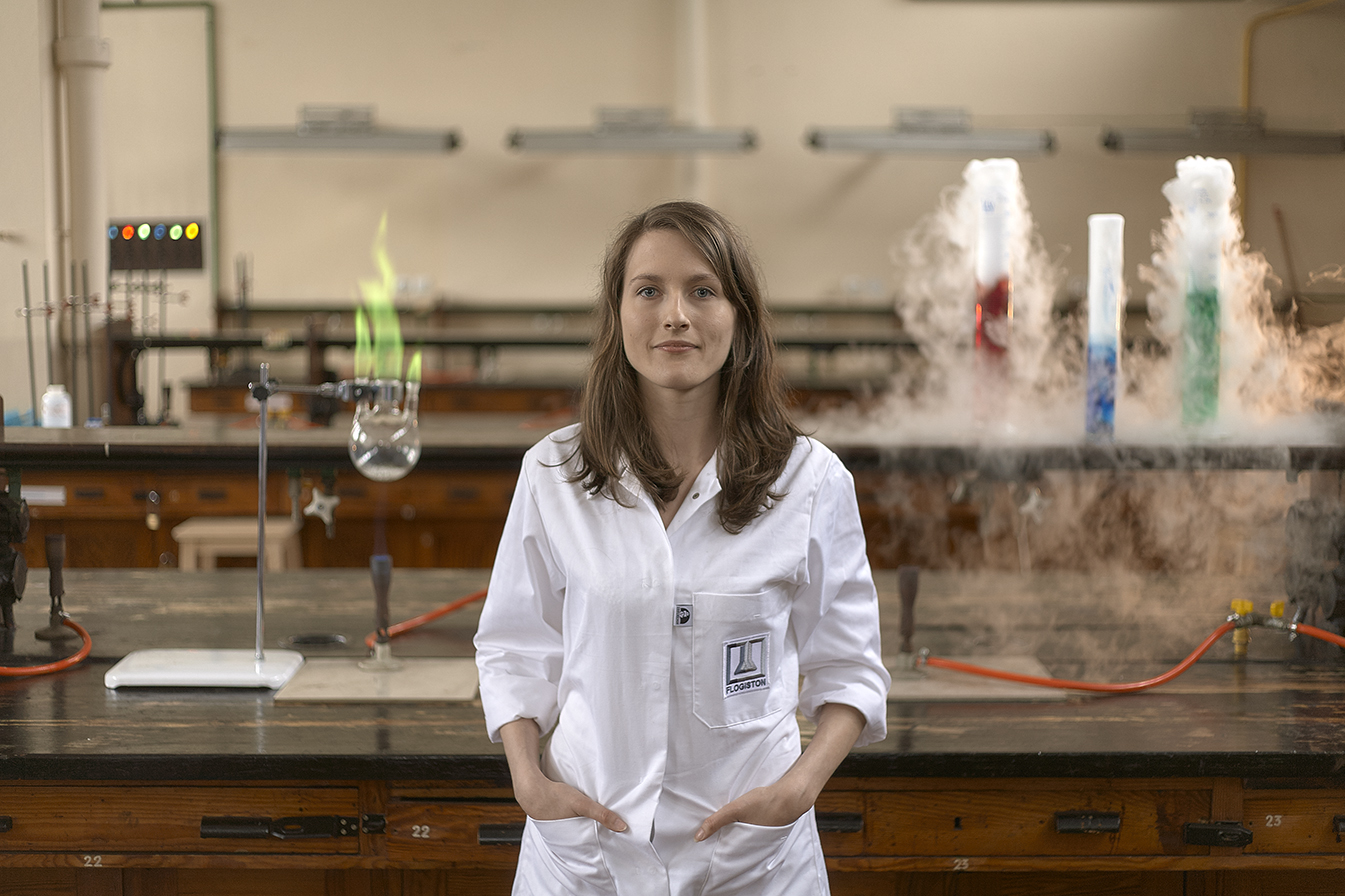
A chemist in the lab of the Warsaw University of Technology in 2011

It is important that those interested in a chemistry degree understand the variety of roles available to them (on average), which vary depending on education and job experience. Chemists who hold a bachelor's degree are most commonly involved in positions related to either research assistance (working under the guidance of senior chemists in a research-oriented activity), or, alternatively, they may work on distinct (chemistry-related) aspects of a business, organization or enterprise including aspects that involve quality control, quality assurance, manufacturing, production, formulation, inspection, method validation, visitation for troubleshooting of chemistry-related instruments, regulatory affairs, "on-demand" technical services, chemical analysis for non-research purposes (e.g., as a legal request, for testing purposes, or for government or non-profit agencies); chemists may also work in environmental evaluation and assessment. Other jobs or roles may include sales and marketing of chemical products and chemistry-related instruments or technical writing. The more experience obtained, the more independence and leadership or management roles these chemists may perform in those organizations. Some chemists with relatively higher experience might change jobs or job position to become a manager of a chemistry-related enterprise, a supervisor, an entrepreneur or a chemistry consultant. Other chemists choose to combine their education and experience as a chemist with a distinct credential to provide different services (e.g., forensic chemists, chemistry-related software development, patent law specialists, environmental law firm staff, scientific news reporting staff, engineering design staff, etc.).

In comparison, chemists who have obtained a Master of Science (M.S.) in chemistry or in a closely related discipline may find chemist roles that allow them to enjoy more independence, leadership and responsibility earlier in their careers with fewer years of experience than those with a bachelor's degree as their highest degree. Sometimes, M.S. chemists receive more complex tasks duties in comparison with the roles and positions found by chemists with a bachelor's degree as their highest academic degree and with the same or nearly the same amount of job experience. There are positions that are open only to those that at least have a degree related to chemistry at the master's level. Although good chemists without a Ph.D. degree but with relatively many years of experience may be allowed some applied research positions, the general rule is that Ph.D. chemists are preferred for research positions and are typically the preferred choice for the highest administrative positions on big enterprises involved in chemistry-related duties. Some research-oriented positions will only allow chemists who are Ph.D. holders. Jobs that involve intensive research and actively seek to lead the discovery of completely new chemical compounds under specifically assigned monetary funds and resources or jobs that seek to develop new scientific theories generally require a Ph.D. Chemists with a Ph.D. as the highest academic degree are found typically on the research-and-development department of an enterprise and can also hold university positions as professors. Professors for research universities or for big universities usually have a Ph.D., and some research-oriented institutions might require post-doctoral training. Some smaller colleges (including some smaller four-year colleges or smaller non-research universities for undergraduates) as well as community colleges usually hire chemists with a M.S. as professors (and rarely, some big universities who need part-time or temporary instructors, or temporary staff), but when the positions are scarce and the applicants are many, they might prefer Ph.D. holders instead.

=== Skills ===
Skills that a chemist may need on the job include:

- Knowledge of chemistry
- Familiarity with product development
- Using scientific rules, strategies, or concepts to solve problems
- Putting together small parts using hands and fingers with dexterity

== Employment ==
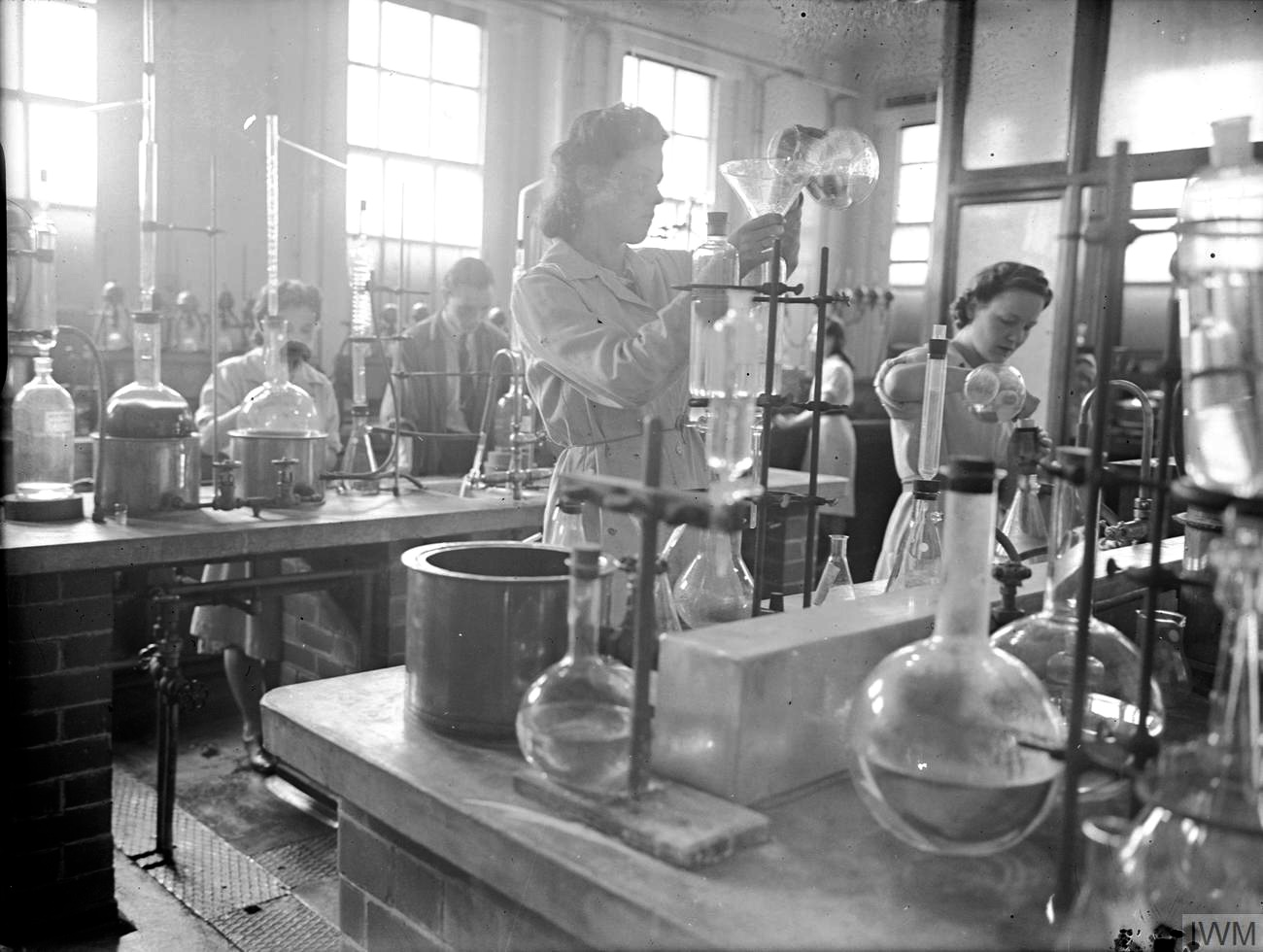
Analytical chemists testing samples of explosives at Royal Naval Cordite Factory, Holton Heath during World War II

Most chemists begin their careers in research laboratories. Many chemists continue working at universities. Other chemists may start companies, teach at high schools or colleges, take samples outside (as environmental chemists), or work in medical examiner offices or police departments (as forensic chemists).

Some software that chemists may find themselves using include:

- ChemSW Buffer Maker
- LabTrack Electronic Lab Notebook
- Agilent ChemStation
- Waters Empower Chromatography Data Software
- Microsoft Excel

Increasingly, chemists may also find themselves using artificial intelligence, such as for drug discovery.

=== Subdisciplines ===
Chemistry is typically organised into several major subdisciplines — including organic, inorganic, physical, analytical, and biochemistry — and encompasses numerous specialised and interdisciplinary fields. Many of these areas overlap with one another and with related sciences, and chemical research often intersects with disciplines such as biology, medicine, physics, materials science, and engineering.

- Analytical chemistry is the analysis of material samples to gain an understanding of their chemical composition and structure. Analytical chemistry incorporates standardized experimental methods in chemistry. These methods may be used in all subdisciplines of chemistry, excluding purely theoretical chemistry.
- Biochemistry is the study of the chemicals, chemical reactions and chemical interactions that take place in living organisms. Biochemistry and organic chemistry are closely related, for example, in medicinal chemistry.

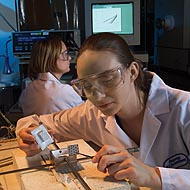
A chemist prepares a new fuel cell for testing at Argonne National Laboratory, Lemont, Illinois.

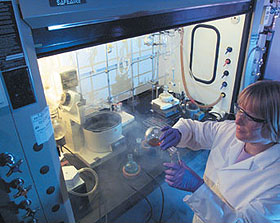
A chemist pours from a round-bottom flask at Lawrence Livermore National Laboratory in Livermore, California.

- Inorganic chemistry is the study of the properties and reactions of inorganic compounds. The distinction between organic and inorganic disciplines is not absolute and there is much overlap, most importantly in the sub-discipline of organometallic chemistry. The Inorganic chemistry is also the study of atomic and molecular structure and bonding.
- Medicinal chemistry is the science involved with designing, synthesizing and developing pharmaceutical drugs. Medicinal chemistry involves the identification, synthesis and development of new chemical entities suitable for therapeutic use. It also includes the study of existing drugs, their biological properties, and their quantitative structure-activity relationships.
- Organic chemistry is the study of the structure, properties, composition, mechanisms, and chemical reaction of carbon compounds.
- Physical chemistry is the study of the physical fundamental basis of chemical systems and processes. In particular, the energetics and dynamics of such systems and processes are of interest to physical chemists. Important areas of study include chemical thermodynamics, chemical kinetics, electrochemistry, quantum chemistry, statistical mechanics, and spectroscopy. Physical chemistry has a large overlap with theoretical chemistry and molecular physics. Physical chemistry involves the use of calculus in deriving equations.
- Theoretical chemistry is the study of chemistry through theoretical reasoning (usually within mathematics or physics). In particular, the application of quantum mechanics to chemistry is called quantum chemistry. Since the end of the Second World War, the development of computers has allowed a systematic development of computational chemistry, which is the art of developing and applying computer programs for solving chemical problems. Theoretical chemistry has large overlap with condensed matter physics and molecular physics; see reductionism.

All the above major areas of chemistry employ chemists. Other fields where chemistry degrees are useful include astrochemistry (and cosmochemistry), atmospheric chemistry, chemical engineering, chemo-informatics, electrochemistry, environmental science, forensic science, geochemistry, green chemistry, history of chemistry, materials science, medical science, molecular biology, molecular genetics, nanotechnology, nuclear chemistry, oenology, organometallic chemistry, petrochemistry, pharmacology, photochemistry, phytochemistry, polymer chemistry, supramolecular chemistry and surface chemistry.

== Professional societies ==
Chemists may belong to professional societies specifically for professionals and researchers within the field of chemistry, such as the Royal Society of Chemistry in the United Kingdom, the American Chemical Society (ACS) in the United States, or the Institution of Chemists in India.

== Ethics ==
The "Global Chemists' Code of Ethics" suggests several ethical principles that all chemists should follow:

- Promoting the general public's appreciation of chemistry
- The importance of sustainability and protecting the environment
- The importance of scientific research and publications
- Respecting safety, such as by using proper personal protective equipment
- Respecting chemical security throughout the chemical supply chain, especially for labs and industrial facilities

This code of ethics was codified in a 2016 conference held in Kuala Lumpur, Malaysia, run by the American Chemical Society. The points listed are inspired by the 2015 Hague Ethical Guidelines.

Some chemists' organizations keep their own codes of ethics. For example, the American Chemical Society developed its first "Chemist's Creed" in 1965 and maintains an ethical code today.

== Honors and awards ==
The highest honor awarded to chemists is the Nobel Prize in Chemistry, awarded since 1901, by the Royal Swedish Academy of Sciences.

== See also ==
- List of chemistry topics
- List of chemists
