= L7 Informatics =

American life sciences software company

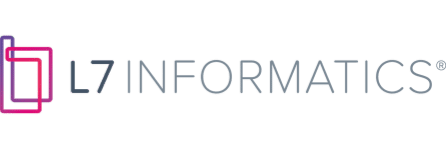
- Formerly: Lab7 Systems
- Type: Private
- Industry: Laboratory informatics Software
- Headquarters: Austin, Texas, United States
- Key people: Vasu Rangadass (CEO)
- Products: L7 Enterprise Science Platform
- Website: l7informatics.com

L7 Informatics is an American life sciences software company based in Austin, Texas. It develops the Enterprise Science Platform (L7 ESP), a system designed to unify scientific data and manage workflows for the pharmaceutical, biotech and diagnostics industries.

== History ==
L7 Informatics was originally established as Lab7 Systems. In May 2018, it was renamed as L7 Informatics and appointed Vasudev Rangadass as chief executive officer. Rangadass previously founded the health IT firm Net.Orange and served as Chief Strategy Officer at NantHealth.

Following the 2018 renaming, L7 Informatics expanded its software platform from genomic workflows to a broader application-based system supporting translational research and cell therapy.

In 2023, L7 Informatics was listed in the Deloitte Technology Fast 500.

== Operations ==
L7 Informatics operates the L7 ESP, a scientific process and data management platform. The system functions as a unified data layer that integrates with Electronic Laboratory Notebooks (ELN), Laboratory Information Management Systems (LIMS), Manufacturing Execution System (MES), and inventory management tools.

In 2018, L7 released an update integrating L7 ESP with Microsoft Azure via Microsoft Genomics to support cloud-based instrumentation and data pipelines.
