= Purnendu Chatterjee =

Indian businessman

Purnendu Chatterjee is an Indian entrepreneur. He is the founder and chairman of The Chatterjee Group (TCG) and also serves as a member of the Governing Board of the Indian School of Business (ISB) in Hyderabad.

== Education ==
Chatterjee graduated from IIT, Kharagpur in 1971 later completed his M.S. and Ph.D. degrees in engineering and Operations Research from the University of California, Berkeley in 1972 and 1974.

== Career ==
Chatterjee was a research associate at the Stanford Research Institute from 1974 to 1976. He joined McKinsey & Co. in 1976 and by 1984 was promoted to a partner of the company. Chatterjee established The Chatterjee Group (TCG) in 1986, which today has diversified interests which includes investment banking, real estate, petrochemicals and life sciences. With its headquarters in New York City, TCG employs over 8000 people worldwide.

== The Chatterjee Group ==
The Chatterjee Group is planning investments of 16 billion dollars in two petrochemicals projects in two Indian states: Tamil Nadu and Odisha.

The group consist of Haldia Petrochemicals, TCG Digital,LabVantage, Lummus Digital, Lummus Technology, Garden Vareli, Fitek, TCG Real Estate, TCG Lifesciences, MCPI, TCG CREST and many more.
