= Georg Endress =

German-Swiss entrepreneur

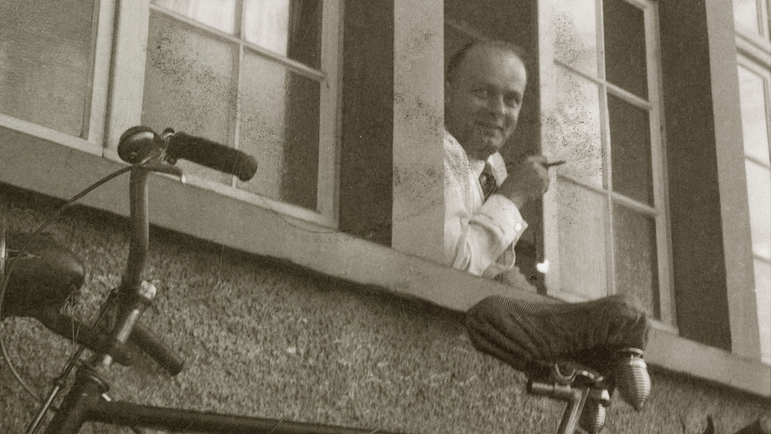
1955 Georg H Endress files his first patent with the Swiss Federal Office of Intellectual Property.

Georg H. Endress (9 January 1924 – 14 December 2008) was a German-Swiss entrepreneur in the area of measurement and control technology, and founder of the company Endress+Hauser.

== Life and work ==
Georg Endress was born on 9 January 1924 in Freiburg im Breisgau. He was born the son of a factory director. At the age of 7, his family moved to Zagreb, where he started school. He attended further schools in Basel (Switzerland) where he passed school-leaving exams, and then took an apprenticeship as a mechanic, after which he studied engineering in Zürich.

He worked for several Swiss companies, and one English firm, before founding a sales company for level measuring devices in Lörrach in 1953 together with the banker Ludwig Hauser, which later became Endress+Hauser AG. The firm began producing its own instruments in 1956. After achieving success in Europe subsidiaries were opened in the USA and Japan (1970) and China (1980). In 1995 Georg Endress handed over control of the firm to his son Klaus Endress.

Georg Endress felt a particular responsibility towards the Dreiländereck (“three-country-corner”) where Germany, France and Switzerland meet, where he wanted, as he himself said, to remove psychological national barriers. He initiated Tri-Nation Apprentice and Engineering education opportunities in the upper Rhine area, promoted international courses at the University Loerrach. The tri-nation BioValley-Organisation was formed on his initiative.

In addition, he was involved in Baden Trade Organisation (WVIB, Wirtschaftsverband industrieller Unternehmen Baden) and the Regional Trade Association Black Forest and Upper Rhine. (Regio-Gesellschaft Schwarzwald-Oberrhein)

He married Alice Vogt in 1946; of their eight children five were active in Endress+Hauser AG at the end of 2008. Endress died on 14 December 2008 in Arlesheim, Switzerland.

== Honours and awards ==
- Federal Cross of Merit, 1st Class
- Honorary Doctorate of the University of Basel
- Honorary Doctorate of the University of Freiburg
- Medal of Service of the State of Baden-Württemberg
- Chevalier de la Legion d'Honneur 2000
- Honorary President of the Bio-Valley and Trade Association WVIB
- Honorary Citizenship of Indianapolis (USA) and the community of Maulburg (Baden-Wuerttemberg)
- The Upper Rhine University Prize Prix Bartholdi was awarded to Georg Endress posthumously in 2011.

== Works ==
- Together with Lothar Spaeth, Martin Saettler, Rainer Roeder und Dieter Pfister) Technologietransfer in Konzeption und Praxis (Technology Transfer, Conception and Practice). Poller, Stuttgart 1987, ISBN 3-87959-305-1
- Veröffentlichungen des International Hightech Forum, Basel 3). (Publication International Hightech Forum, Basel 3).

== Bibliography ==
- Knowledge, Education, Quality. Georg H. Endress on his 80th birthday The Significance of the Educated Entrepreneur and Manager for a Complete and Sustainable Development in Space and Time, Basel, 2005)
- Felix Erbacher: Out of the Garage and into the World. Georg H. Endress (1924-2008), a charismatic thinker and visionary, in:Basler Zeitung, 29. Juli 2013, p. 27.
