= LabArchives =

- Developer(s): LabArchives LLC
- Initial release: 2009
- Type: Electronic lab notebook (ELN)
- Website: www.labarchives.com

LabArchives is a line of cloud-based electronic lab notebooks (ELNs) sold by LabArchives, LLC, which was founded in 2009 by Earl B. Beutler and Kirk Schneider.

LabArchives partnered with BioMed Central in 2012 to store and identify datasets that support peer-reviewed publications. Datasets can be assigned digital object identifiers (DOI) to create a permanent link between the scientific article and the datasets that support it.

LabArchives collaborated with many educational institutions to pilot and study the particular needs of this community. Instructors in a bioengineering course at the University of Wisconsin-Madison published results of a pilot effort using the software to teach the course in 2014, and Yale published a report of adopting it for research labs in 2014. Several studies were also presented at the 2014 Biennial Conference on Chemical Education.

Since 2014, LabArchives has been an Internet2 approved ELN.

LabArchives also offers a laboratory inventory program. as well as scheduling software for management of resources

LabArchives was acquired by Insightful Science (now Dotmatics) in 2021.

== See also ==
- List of ELNs
- Electronic Lab Notebook
