= SAPO =

SAPO or Sapo may refer to:

== Places ==
- Sapo National Park, a national park in Sinoe County, Liberia
- Mount Sapo, a mountain in Cochabamba Department, Bolivia
- Mount Sapo, a mountain in Darién Province, Panama

== Organisations ==
- Swedish Security Service (SÄPO)
- SAPO (company) (Serviço de Apontadores Portugueses Online), a Portuguese Internet service provider
- South African Port Operations, the port management subsidiary of Transnet
- South African Post Office, postal service provider in South Africa
- Specialized Anti-Corruption Prosecutor's Office, a Ukrainian governmental agency

== People ==
- Lindelwa Sapo, South African politician

== Other uses ==
- Sapo, another name of the drug kambo, from the frog Phyllomedusa bicolor (giant leaf frog)
- SAPO, a silico-alumino-phosphate, a type of zeotype material or molecular sieve, related to zeolites
- SAPO (computer), the first Czechoslovak computer
- Sapo language, a Niger-Congo language of Liberia
- Mount Sapo, fictitious mountain in Italy
- Sapo, Portuguese guitar player for rock band Mão Morta
- sapo, a bar game in South America similar to toad in the hole

== See also ==
- Sapio (disambiguation)
