= Haldia Petrochemicals =

Indian petrochemical company

Haldia Petrochemicals Ltd.
- Type: Private
- Industry: Petrochemical
- Founded: 1984; 42 years ago at Kolkata, West Bengal, India
- Headquarters: Kolkata, West Bengal, India
- Area served: Worldwide
- Key people: Purnendu Chatterjee
- Products: Polymers; Chemicals
- Revenue: ▲₹20,165 crore (US$2.1 billion) (2025)
- Net income: ▲₹4,317 crore (US$450 million) (2025)
- Parent: The Chatterjee Group
- Website: Official Website

Haldia Petrochemicals Ltd., often referred to as HPL, is one of the largest petrochemical companies in India. HPL which began commercial production in 2000, has its headquarters located in Kolkata, West Bengal, India. It has a large petrochemical plant based out of Haldia in Eastern India. The company as of 2018 held the position of being the fourth largest player in the domestic petrochemical market and enjoyed a dominant position in Eastern India.

== History ==
- The working of this industry was start from 1977
- 1985 Incorporated as a public limited company
- 1992 Environmental Clearance of the project received
- 1994 MOU signed between WBIDC, Chatterjee Fund Management, Soros Fund Management & Tata Group for implementation of HPL Complex through a joint venture company
- 1996 Land Acquisition completed
- 1997 Project construction started
- 2000 Project got commissioned and trial production started
- 2003 Corporate Debt Restructuring (CDR) got approved
- 2004 Reported PAT for the first time and the turnover surpassed US$1 Billion
- 2005 Capacity was enhanced by 25%
- 2007 Turnover exceeded US$2 Billion and the company reported maximum PAT since inception
- 2009 HPLCL buyout and management control
- 2010 Completion of project Supermax
- 2015 Controlling stake acquired by TCG Group
- 2016 Set up HPL Global Pte Ltd in Singapore as first overseas wholly owned subsidiary

== Financials ==
HPL reported a total income of Rs.10,165 crores during the financial year ended March 31, 2017 as compared to Rs.10,115 crores during the financial year ended March 31, 2016. The company has posted net profit of Rs.2,317 crores for the financial year ended March 31, 2017 as against net profit of Rs.1,579 crores for the financial year ended March 31, 2016.

== Expansion & acquisitions ==
- Lummus Technology: Lummus Technology is a licensor of proprietary technologies in the refining, petrochemicals, gas processing and coal gasification sectors, as well as a supplier of proprietary catalysts, equipment and related engineering services. It has around 130 licensed technologies and more than 3,400 patents and trademarks. Haldia Petrochemicals Ltd (HPL) and Rhone Capital, a global private equity firm, in July 2020 jointly acquired US-based Lummus Technology from McDermott International. The enterprise value of the deal was estimated to be $2.725 billion (approximately ₹20,590 crore). HPL held close to 57 per cent of the enterprise value, amounted out to approximately ₹11,736 crore, to fund the acquisition. The deal was partly funded by equity and partly by debt. State Bank of India was the lead banker in the deal.
- Nagarjuna Oil Corporation Ltd.: NOCL's refinery project in Cuddalore was supposed to go on stream in 2012, but faced numerous delays, including in the form of a cyclone in 2011. Time and cost overruns resulted in the project cost escalating to ₹15,000 crore from ₹3,500 crore. A consortium of 17 banks, that funded the project, was to have brought in an additional ₹7,000 crore debt as part of a restructuring plan. However, it did not materialize and insolvency proceedings were initiated against NOCL. The project was one of the biggest for Tamil Nadu and the state government had offered tax incentives during the global investors meet held in 2015. National Company Law Tribunal had ordered liquidation of NOCL in 2018, after resolution plans failed to materialize. Later, HPL submitted a resolution plan. The NCLT, Chennai in March 2021 approved the resolution plan submitted by Haldia Petrochemicals for NOCL.
- Coastal Oil & Gas Infrastructure: HPL in February 2022 emerged as a successful bidder for Coastal Oil & Gas Infrastructure Pvt. Ltd. (COGIL), a special purpose vehicle of Nagarjuna Oil Corporation Ltd (NOCL), which was acquired by HPL in a liquidation process in 2021. HPL was among the two resolution applicants to have submitted their resolution proposals for acquiring COGIL through the corporate insolvency resolution process. BOMS Private Limited was the other resolution applicant.

== Products & services ==
The company derives 77% of its revenue from polymers such as high density polyethylene (HDPE), linear low density polyethylene (LLDPE), polypropylene and 23% of its sales from chemicals such as benzene, butadiene and motor spirit. Exports account for nearly 20% of the revenues and the share is expected to increase in medium-term. HPL has strong clientele for its products both in the domestic and overseas markets. The marketing of products is carried out by Del Credere Agents which operate on cash and carry model. Naphtha is mainly procured from major international and domestic players such as Indian Oil Corporation Ltd, Bharat Petroleum Corporation Ltd, Kuwait Petroleum Corporation, Shell and many more on both spot and term basis.
