= Chromatography software =

Chromatography software is called also Chromatography Data System. It is located in the data station of modern liquid, gas or supercritical fluid chromatographic systems. This is a dedicated software connected to a hardware interface within the chromatographic system, which serves as a central hub for collecting, analyzing, and managing the data generated during the chromatographic analysis.

The data station is connected to the entire instrument in modern systems, especially the detectors, allowing real-time monitoring of the runs, exhibiting them as chromatograms. A chromatogram is a graphical representation of the results obtained from the chromatographic system. In a chromatogram, each component of the mixture appears as a peak or band at a specific retention time, which is related to its characteristics, such as molecular weight, polarity, and affinity for the stationary phase. The height, width, and area of the peaks in a chromatogram provide information about the amount and purity of the components in the sample. Analyzing a chromatogram helps identify and quantify the substances present in the mixture being analyzed.

== Integration & Processing ==
The major tool of the chromatographic software is peaks "integration". A series of articles describes it: Peak Integration Part 1, Peak Integration Part 2, Peak Integration Part 3. The parameters inside the chromatography software which affect the integration are called the Integration events.

Peak integration in any chromatographic software refers to the process of quantifying the areas under the peak's curve in the chromatogram. The area under the peak is proportional to the amount of that particular component in the sample.

Here are the basics of peak integration in a chromatographic system:

1. Peak Identification: Before integration, the peaks corresponding to different components in the sample need to be identified, based on their retention times. This is typically done by comparing the observed peaks with known standards or reference data.
2. Baseline Correction: Establish a baseline for the chromatogram, which represents the lowest signal level along the time axis next to the peak. The baseline represents the noise and background signal. Taking into account the baseline level allows an accurate integration, because it takes into account any drift or fluctuations in the baseline.
3. Peak Integration parameters and settings: Use appropriate algorithms to integrate the peaks in the chromatogram. Adjust integration parameters and settings as needed, such as noting peak width, noise threshold, and baseline correction method, which determine where the peak starts and ends and its maximum point. Optimizing these parameters helps obtain accurate and precise integration results.
4. Quantification: Once the areas under the peaks are determined through integration, the quantification of each component is performed. The integrated areas are compared to a calibration curve, created using standards' concentrations to calculate the concentration of each component in the unknown sample.
5. Data Interpretation: The software analyzes the integrated data to draw conclusions about the composition, concentration, and purity of the sample. The integrated areas provide valuable information for various applications, including quality control, research, and analysis.
6. Validation and Quality Control: It is important to ensure the accuracy and reliability of the integration process, by performing validation and quality control checks to the software itself. This may involve comparing integration results with known standards, replicating analyses, and assessing precision and accuracy

Applications are also available for simulation of chromatography, for example for teaching, demonstration, or for method development &/or optimization.

== Software Packages ==
Many chromatography software packages are provided by manufacturers, and many of them only provide a simple interface to acquire data. They also provide different tools to analyze this data.

The following is a list of software and the (unexplained) tools that each provides. Please note that some of them were discontinued with the years.

Chromatography software
Name	Publisher	Control	Analysis	Type	Comments
GC-SOS	The 4S Co.	No	Yes	GC	simulation-optimization
Malcom	Schlumberger	No	Yes	GC/GC-MS	
ChemStation	Agilent	Yes	Yes	LC/GC/LC-MS/GC-MS	discontinued
EZChrom Elite	Agilent	Yes	Yes	LC/GC	
OpenLAB CDS	Agilent	Yes	Yes	LC/GC/LC-MS/GC-MS	
Analytical Studio	Virscidian	Yes	Yes	LC/GC/SFC-MS	Vendor agnostic data analysis and decision making informatics solution
Chromeleon	Thermo Scientific	Yes	Yes	GC/LC/IEX/MS	
Empower	Waters	Yes	Yes	GC/LC	
OpenChrom	Lablicate	No	Yes	GC/LC/LC-MS/GC-MS	open-source EPL with commercial support
Atlas CDS	Thermo Scientific	Yes	Yes	GC/LC	
Clarity	DataApex	Yes	Yes	GC/LC/MS	independent software
Mass Frontier	HighChem		Yes	GC/LC/MS	
MassLynx	Waters	Yes		LC/MS	
LabSolutions	Shimadzu	Yes	Yes	LC/GC	
PowerChrom	eDAQ	Yes	Yes	LC/GC/CE	
ChromStar7	SCPA	Yes	Yes	LC	
PrepCon5	SCPA	Yes	Yes	LC-Prep/MS	
Unicorn 7.0	GE Life Sciences	Yes	Yes	LC/GC/LC-MS/GC-MS	
Trilution LC	Gilson	Yes	Yes	LC/LC-MS	
ChromNAV	JASCO	Yes	Yes	LC	
CHROMuLAN	PiKRON	Yes	Yes	LC	open-source GPL
ChromaTOF	LECO	Yes	Yes	GC/GC-TOF-MS	
Peaksel	Elsci	No	Yes	LC/GC, MS (SQD, QqQ, QTOF)/DAD/etc;	Web app, cloud and on-prem installation, supports High Throughput Analysis. Has free offerings.
Mestrenova	Mestrelab research	No	Yes	LC/GC/LC-MS/GC-MS/SFC-MS	vendor independent data analysis software
PeakLab	AIST Software	No	Yes	GC/LC	nonlinear peak fitting
CompassCDS	Scion Instruments	Yes	Yes	GC/LC	XML
QuantaSep	Sepragen	Yes	Yes	LC	

== See also ==
- Laboratory informatics
