= LabVantage =

Laboratory information management system (LIMS) provider

LabVantage Solutions, Inc.
- LabVantage's logo
- Predecessor: Laboratory MicroSystems
- Founded: 1981 in Troy, New York
- Founders: Mark Chudzickin; Michael Boskin
- Headquarters: Somerset, New Jersey
- Key people: Mikael Hagstroem (CEO)
- Parent: The Chatterjee Group
- Website: www.labvantage.com

LabVantage Solutions, Inc. is a laboratory information management system (LIMS) provider based in Somerset, New Jersey. Founded in 1981, LabVantage is the third largest LIMS provider in the world.

Laboratory MicroSystems was founded by Mark Chudzicki and Michael Boskin in 1981. Chudzicki started the company when he was attending graduate school at Rensselaer Polytechnic Institute. The company began making money several years after it was founded but needed a $100,000 loan from New York state's Corporation for Innovation Development. Laboratory MicroSystems received financing from 100 Capital District shareholders in 1985. The company in 1986 was based in Hendrik Hudson Hotel, a downtown Troy hotel that was refurbished into an office building, employed 15 people, and had annual sales of $1 million.

It was named to the Inc. 500 in 1987 after a 532% increase in sales in its first five years in business. The company in 1988 primarily served Fortune 500 companies including General Electric, Dow Corning, Pennzoil, DuPont, Monsanto, and Exxon. It set up software that cost between $10,000 and $70,000 in 1990. Chudzicki and Boskin in 1990 sold the company, which had 12 employees at the time, to Instron. The offer was for about $2.5 million, half to be paid in Instron stock and half to be paid in cash. The acquisition was finalized at $2.42 million to be distributed among Laboratory MicroSystems' 100 shareholders.

In 1997, Instron sold Laboratory MicroSystems to Axiom Systems, a subsidiary of Purnendu Chatterjee's The Chatterjee Group, which renamed the company to LabVantage. Strategic Directions International said in a 2000 report, "by the late 1990s, the company appeared to have lost its way" because the numerous products LabVantage had to maintain caused it to be "overwhelmed" which hurt its client contentment. The report further noted that the company's sales failed to increase meaningfully in the past few years.

In 2005, about half of the company's employees work in India, while 60 employees are in North America and 20 are in Europe.

LabVantage's customers in the United States include Aventis, Pfizer, and Unilever's Best Foods (now called Hellmann's and Best Foods). In India, LabVantage provides services for GAIL, Indian Oil Corporation, and Reliance Industries.
