= Agilent ChemStation =

- Operating system: Windows
- Type: Liquid chromatography software
- License: proprietary
- Website: ChemStation on Agilent website

Agilent ChemStation is a software package to control Agilent liquid chromatography, gas chromatography, and ultraviolet-visible spectroscopy systems such as the 1050, 1100 and 1200 Series HPLC system and the 8453 and 8454 single-beam diode array detector spectrophotometers. It is an evolution of the Hewlett-Packard ChemStation System.

Two versions are available: one ("online") in connection with the modules of the HPLC chain is designed to control instruments and run experiments, and the other ("offline"), without a connection with the HPLC chain, is designed to analyze data.

ChemStation is structured around a number of registers. Two of the more important registers are CHROMREG and CHROMRES, the chromatographic data registers. Other special registers exist for the UV-vis implementation of the software.

ChemStation has a command line interpreter and can run macros. Those macros are files grouping a set of commands. These files possess a .mac extension.

ChemStation can import analysis lists and export result files in XML by adding new lines to the ChemStation.ini configuration file. This is a feature to implement the connection with a Laboratory information management system (LIMS).
