= The Hendrik Hudson =

Apartment building in Manhattan, New York

Coordinates: 40.8050°N 73.9677°W

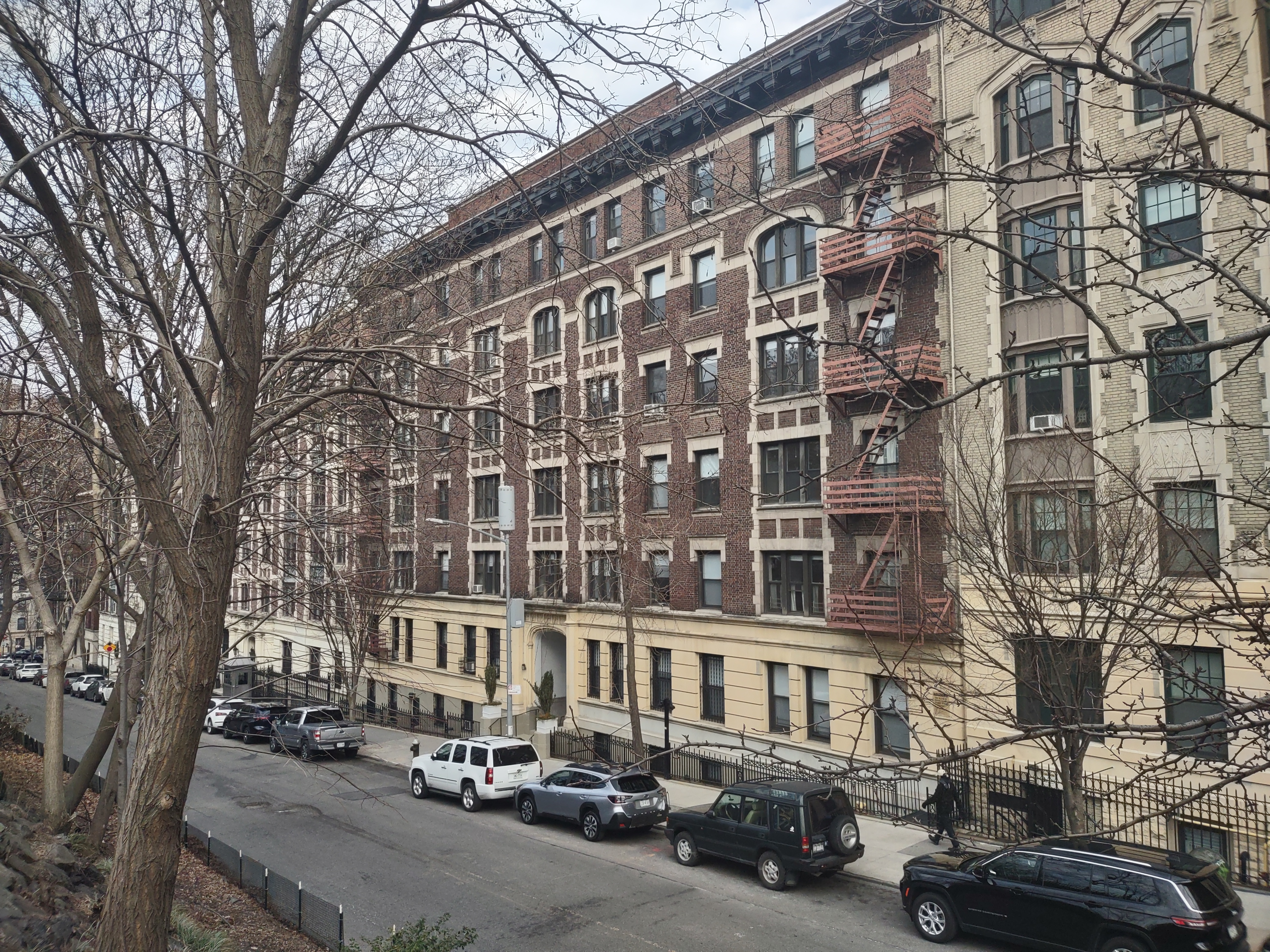
The Hendrick Hudson in 2025

The Hendrik Hudson, formally known as the Hendrik Hudson Residence Hotel, is a Tuscan-style apartment building located on Riverside Drive in Morningside Heights, Manhattan, New York City. The first plans for a building named for Hendrik Hudson on Riverside Drive were announced in October 1897 by Eugene Kirby, a former manager of the Marie Antoinette Hotel. This was to be an 18-story hotel. These plans were never completed, however, and by 1907, an apartment building bearing the name had been constructed instead.

== History ==
In order to take advantage of the New York City Subway's newly opened line in the area, developers George F Johnson and Aleck Kahn purchased three-quarters of the block defined by Riverside Drive, Broadway, West 110th Street and 111th Street in order to build an apartment complex. The architectural firm of Rouse & Sloan was hired to design and construct the building. The project was led by William L Rouse, and the result was an eight-story building modeled after a Tuscan Villa, containing 72 apartment units. The building also featured two towers, on the north and south sides, connected by a promenade. The apartments officially opened on October 1, 1907, and the units were quickly rented. Due to this success, a 12-story annex, also designed by William Rouse, was constructed.

The apartment building continued to enjoy success for several decades, until the aftermath of the 1943 rent-control law caused it to rapidly deteriorate. The current landlords of the building were brought to court in 1958 due to the slum-like conditions of the building, and were sentenced to a 30-day jail term. This, along with the investigation of the accidental death of a small child in the building, prompted renovations to be carried out in 1959. In 1971, the Hendrik Hudson became a co-op, and the north tower was removed. In 1996, the decision was made to preserve the deteriorating south tower as a "stabilized ruin", despite its preservation costing more than demolishing it.
