= Analytik Jena =

Analytik Jena GmbH+Co. KG
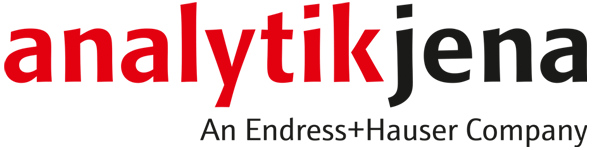
- Company type: GmbH+Co. KG
- Founded: 1990
- Headquarters: Jena, Germany
- Key people: Oliver Klaeffling (CEO)
- Revenue: €140.7 million (2021)
- Number of employees: 581 (2021)
- Divisions: Analytical Instrumentation Technology, Biotechnology
- Website: www.analytik-jena.com

Analytik Jena GmbH+Co. KG, based in Jena (Thuringia, Germany), is a provider of analytical, bioanalytical and optical systems for industrial and scientific applications. Analytik Jena was founded in 1990 as a sales and service company for analytical technology. The company has been listed on the Frankfurt Stock Exchange from July 3, 2000 until March 27, 2015. Analytik Jena and its subsidiaries employ about 1,000 people in more than 90 countries. The international Group earns two-thirds of sales abroad and maintains business relationships in more than 120 countries around the globe.

== History ==
Analytik Jena was founded jointly by Klaus Berka along with Jens Adomat in 1990. Due to the purchase of the laboratory analysis technology of Carl Zeiss Jena GmbH at the end of 1995, the Company's market share in the instrument business increased further.

== Business Model ==
Analytik Jena provides high-end analysis systems for the qualitative and quantitative analysis of liquids, solids, and gases in environmental, foodstuffs, pharmaceutical, medical, and agricultural Analysis.

- Mass Spectrometry: ICP-MS
- Inductively coupled plasma: ICP-OES
- Atomic Spectrometry: AAS | AFS | Microwave
- Molecular Spectroscopy: UV/Vis | NIR
- Sum Parameters: TOC | TN | TNb | AOX | TOX | TX
- Elemental Analysis: C | N | S | Cl
- Antioxidants/Free radicals
- Water Determination
- LIMS
- UV Vis Spectrophotometer

== Corporate Structure ==
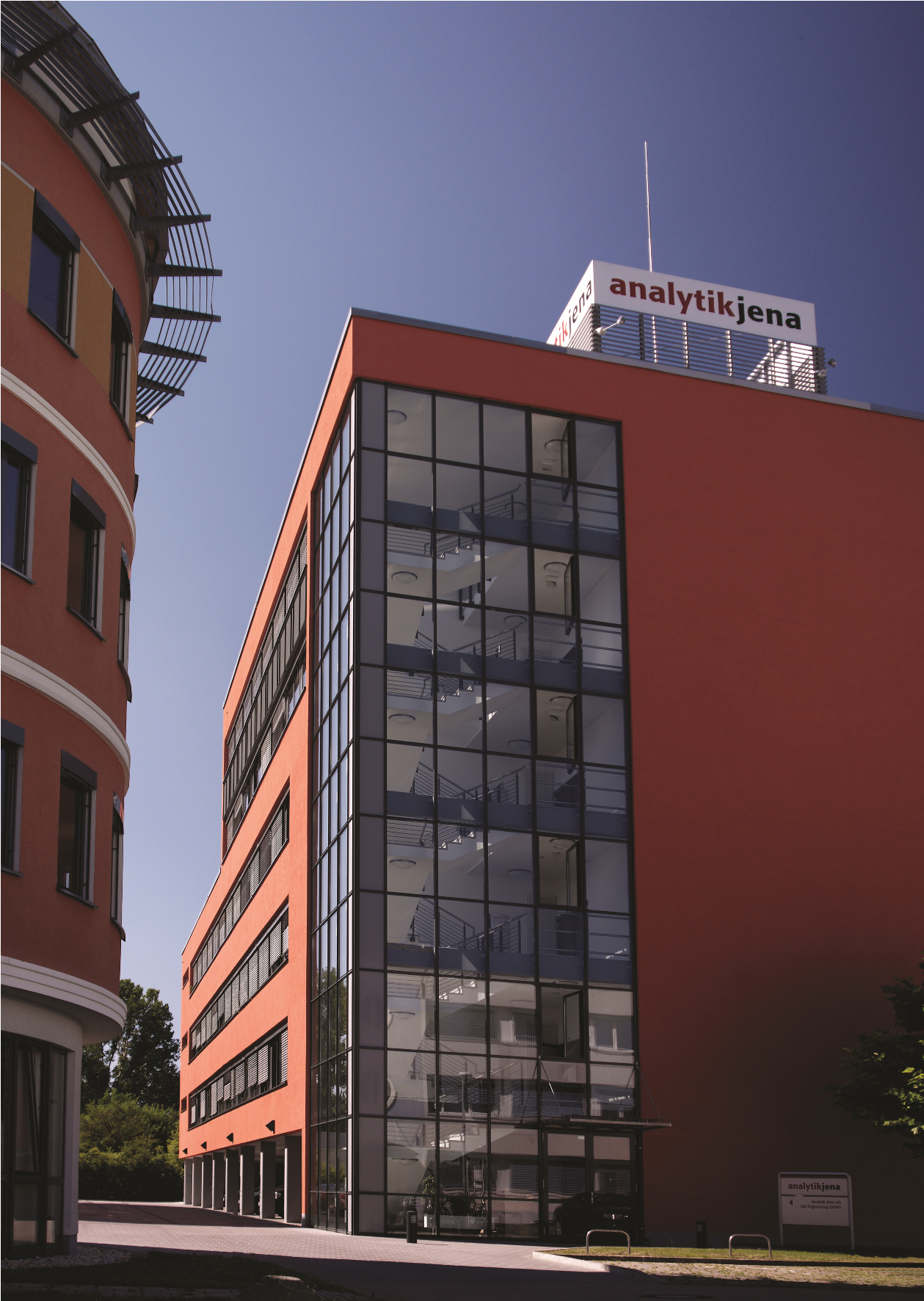
Head office of Analytik Jena GmbH+Co. KG in Germany

The Analytik Jena GmbH+Co. KG headquarter is located in Jena, Germany.
