= OpenWetWare =

Biology and biological engineering wiki

- Website logo

OpenWetWare was a wiki whose mission is "to support open research, education, publication, and discussion in biological sciences and engineering."

OpenWetWare was created by graduate students at MIT on April 20, 2005. Initially, it served as a private lab wiki for the labs of Drew Endy and Tom Knight at MIT. The site was opened up to allow any lab to join on June 22, 2005. As of April 6, 2007, the site hosted 100 research laboratories from over 40 institutions, including Boston University, Brown University, Caltech, University of Cambridge, CNRS, Duke University, and many others. The server was shut down on April 15, 2025 due to a lack of funding, but returned on October 27th. As of August 2026, it is again no longer online.

In addition to laboratories, a number of scientific communities are based on the site, including synthetic biology, Mimulus, and the BioBricks Foundation. One scientific community is the iGEM community with over 60 different teams represented on June 28, 2013, including the NRP-UEA-Norwich team and the Groningen team.

OpenWetWare ran on MediaWiki software on Linux servers. All content is available under free content licenses, specifically the GNU Free Documentation License (GFDL) and the Creative Commons Attribution ShareAlike (CC-BY-SA) license.
