= ElabFTW =

elabFTW
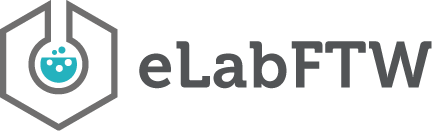
- Developer(s): Nicolas Carpi
- Stable release: 3.4.9 / 2020-04-27
- Repository: github.com/elabftw/elabftw
- Operating system: Cross-platform
- Type: Web application
- License: AGPLv3
- Website: www.elabftw.net

eLabFTW is a web application written by Nicolas Carpi in PHP which can be used to create personal and common logbooks. It has been developed at the Curie Institute originally. Besides there, it is used on universities around the world

eLabFTW is licensed under the GNU Affero General Public License as free software. It is translated into seven languages.

== Description ==
eLabFTW is a free and open-source lab book. It is written in PHP and uses a MySQL database. Docker containers are also available. Among the various features are

- Secure. Entries and transmission are encrypted
- Timestamps. RFC 3161 compliant timestamping of experiments.
- Inventory management. Apart from experience logs, it also can manage the inventory
- Import and export. Entries can be imported and exported

== Platforms ==
eLabFTW is a PHP package with Mysql database. Therefore, it can be executed on most servers. Furthermore, the docker containers allow to run it almost everywhere.

== Usage ==
eLabFTW is used by various universities, like University of Alberta, Berkeley University, Hanover Medical School, Cardiff University and UMC Utrecht
