= Electronic lab notebook =

Computer program designed to replace paper lab notebooks

- Developers: Various commercial and open-source vendors
- Operating system: Cross-platform (varies by implementation)
- Type: Laboratory information management / Knowledge management
- License: Proprietary, Free software (varies)

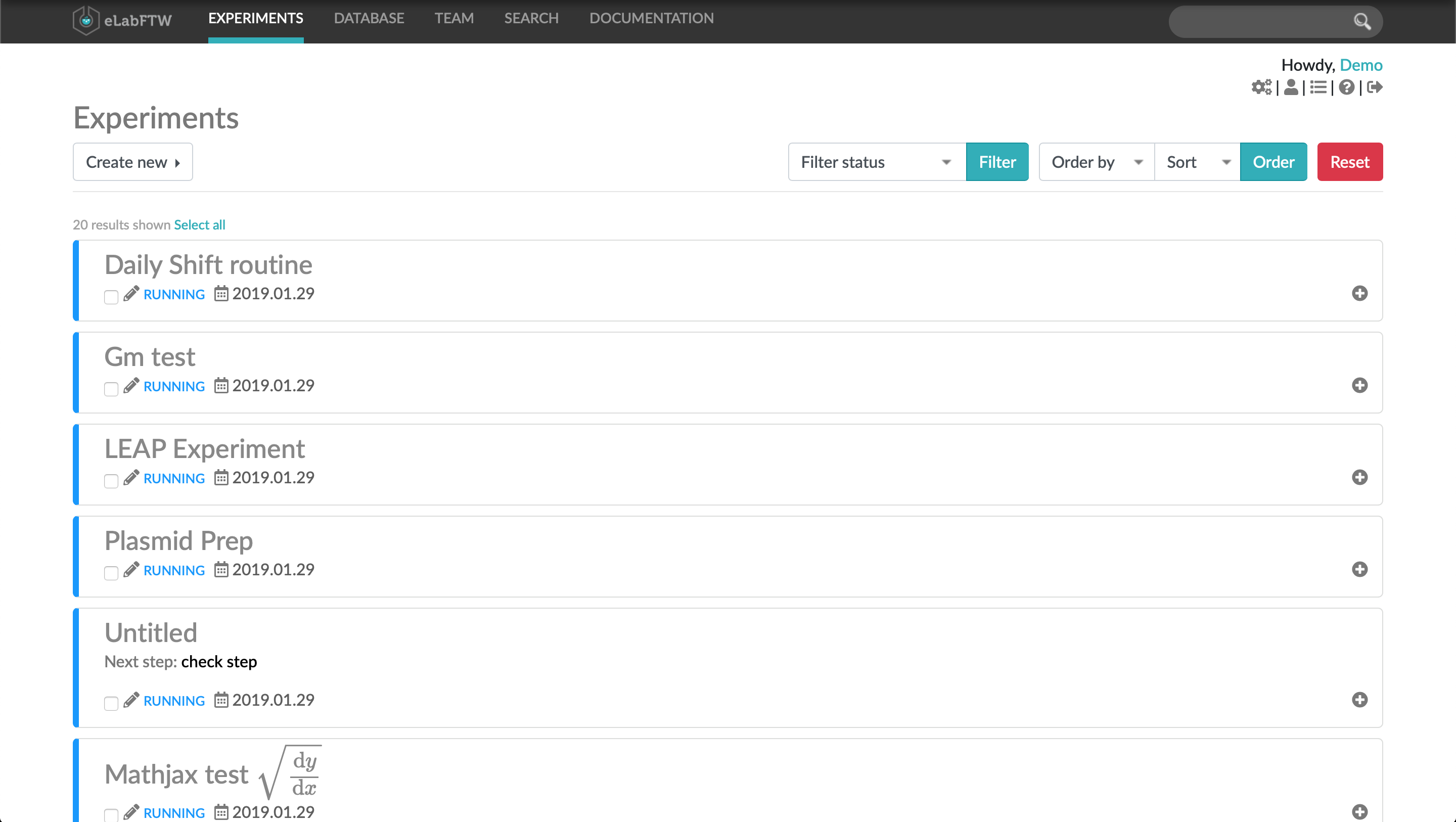
User interface of eLabFTW

An electronic lab notebook or electronic laboratory notebook (ELN) is a computer program designed to replace paper laboratory notebooks. Lab notebooks in general are used by scientists, engineers, and technicians to document research, experiments, and procedures performed in a laboratory. A lab notebook is often maintained to be a legal document and may be used in a court of law as evidence. Similar to an inventor's notebook, the lab notebook is also often referred to in patent prosecution and intellectual property litigation.

Electronic lab notebooks offer many benefits to the user as well as organizations; they are easier to search upon, simplify data copying and backups, and support collaboration amongst many users. ELNs can have fine-grained access controls, and can be more secure than their paper counterparts. They also allow the direct incorporation of data from instruments, replacing the practice of printing out data to be stapled into a paper notebook.

== Types ==
ELNs can be divided into two categories:

- "Specific ELNs" contain features designed to work with specific applications, scientific instrumentation or data types.
- "Cross-disciplinary ELNs" or "Generic ELNs" are designed to support access to all data and information that needs to be recorded in a lab notebook.
- Lab Platforms that combine an ELN for experiments, LIMS for samples, and scientific data management together, all-in-one configurable software environment.

Solutions range from specialized programs designed from the ground up for use as an ELN, to modifications or direct use of more general programs. Examples of using more general software as an ELN include using OpenWetWare, a MediaWiki install (running the same software that Wikipedia uses), WordPress, or the use of general note taking software such as OneNote as an ELN.

ELN's come in many different forms. They can be standalone programs, use a client-server model, or be entirely web-based. Some use a lab-notebook approach, others resemble a blog. ELNs are embracing artificial intelligence and LLM technology to provide scientific AI chat assistants.

A good many variations on the "ELN" acronym have appeared. Differences between systems with different names are often subtle, with considerable functional overlap between them. Examples include "ERN" (Electronic Research Notebook), "ERMS" (Electronic Resource (or Research or Records) Management System (or Software) and SDMS (Scientific Data (or Document) Management System (or Software). Ultimately, these types of systems all strive to do the same thing: Capture, record, centralize and protect scientific data in a way that is highly searchable, historically accurate, and legally stringent, and which also promotes secure collaboration, greater efficiency, reduced mistakes and lowered total research costs.

== Objectives ==
A good electronic laboratory notebook should offer a secure environment to protect the integrity of both data and process. Flexibility to adopt new processes or modify existing processes without recourse to further software development is simpler and may be achievable with templates defined by users via the UI rather than by editing source code. A modular design for the ELN package architecture can minimize validation costs of any subsequent changes that a user may wish to make in the future as their needs change.

A good electronic laboratory notebook should be an "out of the box" solution that, as standard, has fully configurable forms to comply with the requirements of regulated analytical groups through to a sophisticated ELN for inclusion of structures, spectra, chromatograms, pictures, text, etc. where a preconfigured form is less appropriate. All data within the system may be stored in a database (e.g. MySQL, MS-SQL, Oracle) and be fully searchable. The system should enable data to be collected, stored and retrieved through any combination of forms or ELN that best meets the requirements of the user.

The application should enable secure forms to be generated that accept laboratory data input via PCs and/or laptops / palmtops, and should be directly linked to electronic devices such as laboratory balances, pH meters, etc. Networked or wireless communications should be accommodated for by the package which will allow data to be interrogated, tabulated, checked, approved, stored and archived to comply with the latest regulatory guidance and legislation. A system should also include a scheduling option for routine procedures such as equipment qualification and study related timelines. It should include configurable qualification requirements to automatically verify that instruments have been cleaned and calibrated within a specified time period, that reagents have been quality-checked and have not expired, and that workers are trained and authorized to use the equipment and perform the procedures.

== Regulatory and legal aspects ==
The laboratory accreditation criteria found in the ISO 17025 standard needs to be considered for the protection and computer backup of electronic records. These criteria can be found specifically in clause 4.13.1.4 of the standard.

Electronic lab notebooks used for development or research in regulated industries, such as medical devices or pharmaceuticals, are expected to comply with FDA regulations related to software validation. The purpose of the regulations is to ensure the integrity of the entries in terms of time, authorship, and content. Unlike ELNs for patent protection, FDA is not concerned with patent interference proceedings, but is concerned with avoidance of falsification. Typical provisions related to software validation are included in the medical device regulations at 21 CFR 820 (et seq.) and Title 21 CFR Part 11. Essentially, the requirements are that the software has been designed and implemented to be suitable for its intended purposes. Evidence to show that this is the case is often provided by a Software Requirements Specification (SRS) setting forth the intended uses and the needs that the ELN will meet; one or more testing protocols that, when followed, demonstrate that the ELN meets the requirements of the specification and that the requirements are satisfied under worst-case conditions. Security, audit trails, prevention of unauthorized changes without substantial collusion of otherwise independent personnel (i.e., those having no interest in the content of the ELN such as independent quality unit personnel) and similar tests are fundamental. Finally, one or more reports demonstrating the results of the testing in accordance with the predefined protocols are required prior to release of the ELN software for use. If the reports show that the software failed to satisfy any of the SRS requirements, then corrective and preventive action ("CAPA") must be undertaken and documented. Such CAPA may extend to minor software revisions, or changes in architecture or major revisions. CAPA activities need to be documented as well.

Aside from the requirements to follow such steps for regulated industry, such an approach is generally a good practice in terms of development and release of any software to assure its quality and fitness for use. There are standards related to software development and testing that can be applied (see ref.).

== See also ==
- List of ELN software packages
- Data management
- Laboratory informatics
- Jupyter
