= Laboratory informatics =

Computerized systems for improving research management and storing data

Laboratory informatics is the specialized application of information technology aimed at optimizing and extending laboratory operations. It encompasses data acquisition (e.g. through sensors and hardware or voice), instrument interfacing, laboratory networking, data processing, specialized data management systems (such as a chromatography data system), a laboratory information management system, scientific data management (including data mining and data warehousing), and knowledge management (including the use of an electronic lab notebook). It has become more prevalent with the rise of other "informatics" disciplines such as bioinformatics, cheminformatics and health informatics. Several graduate programs are focused on some form of laboratory informatics, often with a clinical emphasis. A closely related - some consider subsuming - field is laboratory automation.

== Capability Areas ==
In the context of Public Health Laboratories, the Association of Public Health Laboratories has identified 19 areas for self-assessment of laboratory informatics in their Laboratories Efficiencies Initiative. These include the following Capability Areas.

- Laboratory Test Request and Sample Receiving
- Test Preparation, LIMS Processing, Test Results Recording and Verification
- Report Preparation and Distribution
- Laboratory Test Scheduling
- Prescheduled Testing
- Specimen and Sample Tracking/Chain of Custody
- Media, Reagents, Controls: Manufacturing and Inventory
- Interoperability and Data Exchange
- Statistical Analysis and Surveillance
- Billing for Laboratory Services
- Contract and Grant Management
- Training, Education and Resource Management
- Laboratory Certifications/Licensing
- Customer Relationship Management
- Quality Control (QC) and Quality Assurance (QA) Management
- Laboratory Safety and Accident Investigation
- Laboratory Mutual Assistance/Disaster Recovery
- Core IT Service Management: Hardware, Software and Services
- Policies and Procedures, including Budgeting and Funding

== Sub-topics ==
- Laboratory information management system (LIMS)
- List of LIMS software packages
- Chromatography data system (CDS)
- Electronic lab notebook (ELN)
- List of ELN software packages

== Organizations ==
- Society for Laboratory Automation & Screening (SLAS)
- American Association for Clinical Chemistry (AACC)
- Laboratory Informatics Institute

== Publications ==
- American Laboratory

== See also ==
- Informatics
