= Antony John Williams =

British chemist

Antony Williams
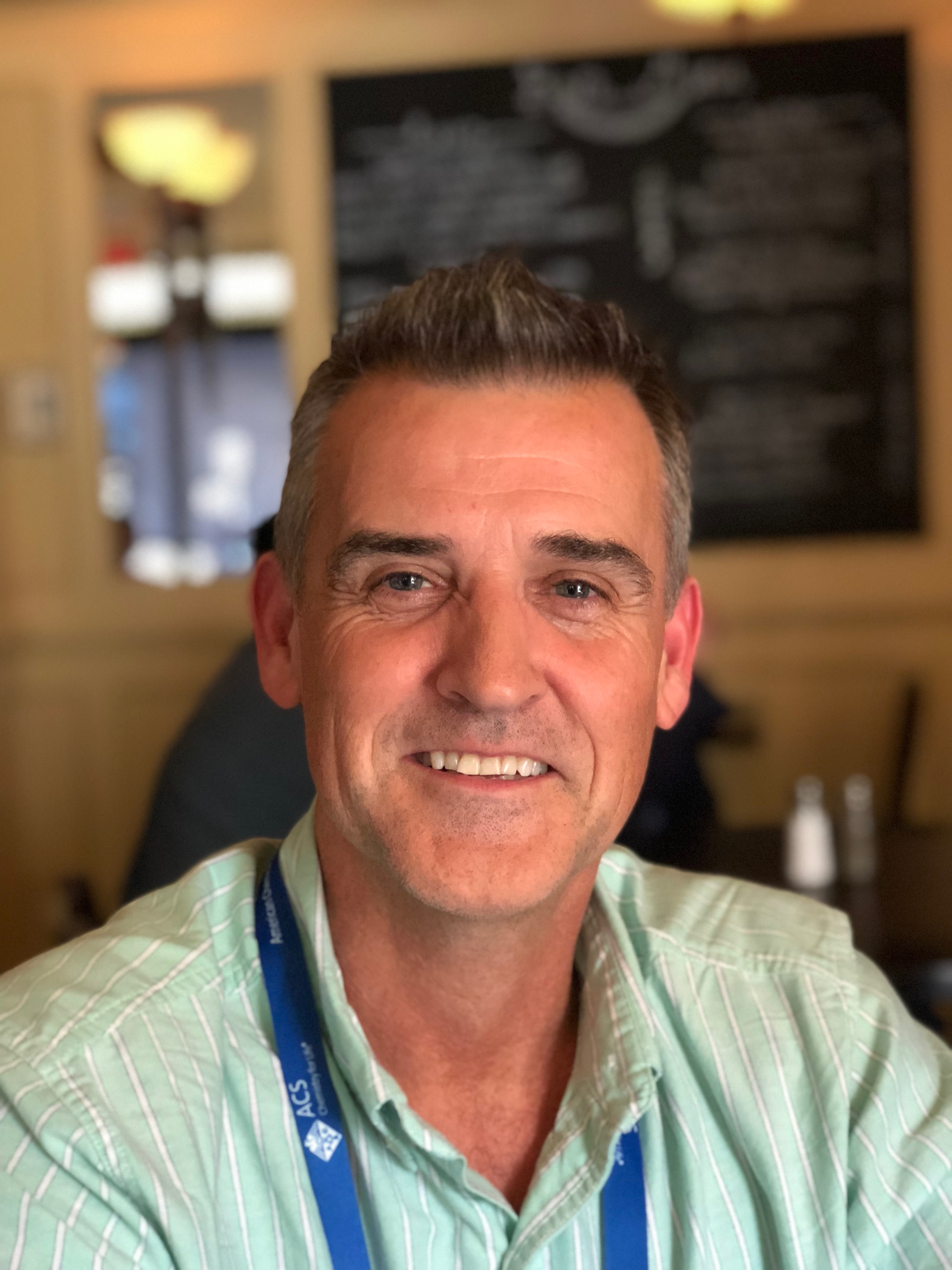
- Born: Antony John Williams; St Asaph, Denbighshire, Wales
- Education: Royal Holloway, University of London (PhD); University of Liverpool (BSc)
- Known for: Structural elucidation; Nuclear magnetic resonance; ChemSpider; Open PHACTS; Open Notebook Science
- Awards: Jim Gray e-Science award (2012)
- Scientific career
- Fields: Chemistry; Spectroscopy; Cheminformatics
- Workplaces: United States Environmental Protection Agency; Eastman Kodak Company; Advanced Chemistry Development; Royal Society of Chemistry; Ottawa University; National Research Council of Canada
- Thesis: High pressure NMR and relaxation studies of alkyl chain systems (1988)
- Doctoral advisor: Duncan G. Gillies
- William's voice recorded December 2014
- Website: www.chemconnector.com

Antony John Williams is a British chemist and expert in the fields of both nuclear magnetic resonance (NMR) spectroscopy and cheminformatics at the United States Environmental Protection Agency. He is the founder of the ChemSpider website that was purchased by the Royal Society of Chemistry in May 2009. He is a science blogger and an author.

== Early life and education ==
Antony Williams was born in St Asaph, Wales, June 1964 to Ernest Edward Williams, owner of a building contracting firm, and Eirlys Elizabeth Williams. He has one older sister, Rae. He grew up in a small village near Caerwys.

Williams attended Primary School in both Holywell and Nannerch until 1975. From the age of eleven, he attended Alun School where he received A-levels in mathematics, geography, and chemistry.

Williams earned his Bachelor of Science in chemistry from the University of Liverpool, in 1985, writing an undergraduate dissertation on "Spectroscopic Studies of Vitamin E Related Systems" where he applied both electron paramagnetic resonance (EPR) and Nuclear magnetic resonance spectroscopy (NMR) to the study of molecules similar in structure to Vitamin E.

Williams earned his Ph.D. in chemistry, funded by Royal Dutch Shell, from Royal Holloway, University of London in 1988 and wrote a thesis entitled "High pressure NMR and relaxation studies of alkyl chain systems". He won the Bourne Medal from the University of London for this work and developed a unifying theory for modeling NMR relaxation data to examine the molecular motions of alkyl chains. He also used the Cobalt-59 NMR chemical shift for cobalt (III) hexacyanide as both a temperature and pressure probe. During his PhD he developed an interest in personal computers and wrote software programs to fit NMR relaxation data.

Williams continued his work in spectroscopy at the National Research Council (Canada) using EPR spectroscopy to perform single-crystal studies of organometallics compounds.

== Career ==
In 1991, Williams joined Ottawa University as their NMR Facility Manager. He continued his personal interests in multinuclear NMR to perform 2D-NMR experiments examining Selenium exchange in mixed-halogen systems. He also performed Silicon-29 and Tellurium-125 NMR studies.

In 1992 Williams left Canada for Rochester, NY to work for the Eastman Kodak Company as their NMR Technology Leader. At Kodak he used his previous experience in studying alkyl chain related systems to study micelles. He was involved in the early adoption of Liquid Chromatography-NMR into the company and in the development of an Open Access laboratory for chemists to use roboticized analytical instrumentation to generate data. At Kodak he was part of a three-member team that developed a web-based Laboratory information management system (LIMS) system called WIMS, the Web-based Information Management System and it was the first web-based LIMS system in the world to manage chemical structures and spectral data. He was granted two patents while at Kodak,

In 1997 he started work for a Canadian start-up company, Advanced Chemistry Development (ACD/Labs) as their senior product manager. He was responsible for managing all spectroscopy, structure drawing and IUPAC nomenclature, products. While in that role the analytical data management software was expanded to include support for mass spectrometry, infrared spectroscopy, UV-Vis spectroscopy, chromatography and other forms of analytical sciences. His research interests at that time include the development of algorithms for NMR prediction ( and) and, specifically, development of software approaches to Computer Assisted structure Elucidation, so-called CASE systems. The CASE tools have been used for the purpose of structure revision whereby algorithms have been demonstrated to outperform human interpretation of spectral data. While at ACD/Labs Williams was involved in a number of industry firsts including

1. producing a chemical dictionary on a Palm Computer and Pocket PC,
2. working with Gary E. Martin and other colleagues to develop new NMR processing techniques using covariance-based approaches,
3. the introduction of fuzzy-logic based approaches to computer-assisted structure elucidation and 4) Approaches for automated structure verification.

While at the company he initiated a hobby project to link together chemistry databases on the web. This project was called ChemSpider. ChemSpider was formally announced at the Chicago ACS meeting in March 2007 with a database containing over 10 million compounds sourced from PubChem. In 2007 when he left ACD/Labs he was the Chief Science Officer. He became an independent consultant working with a number of software companies in the cheminformatics domain, such as SimBioSys, and with research organizations to support their cheminformatics efforts. In parallel he continued to develop the ChemSpider platform with a small group of like-minded individuals interested in the development of web-based systems to serve chemists The site is a crowdsourced community for chemistry with chemists depositing their structure collections, spectral data and molecular properties. Williams is focused on educating the community as to the issues of data quality associated with internet chemistry databases.

In May 2009 the Royal Society of Chemistry announced that it had acquired ChemSpider. Williams joined RSC as their Vice President of Strategic Development for ChemSpider.

In May 2015 he joined the United States Environmental Protection Agency to work on the development of websites delivering public access to EPA data and tools for mass spectrometry.

Williams has contributed to the world of "Mobile Chemistry" by contributing to the development of ChemMobi, an iPhone app for accessing millions of chemical compounds and associated data.

Williams is an advocate for Open Notebook Science and is a judge for the Open Notebook Science Challenge. He worked with Jean-Claude Bradley to deliver a web-based game for teaching the interpretation of spectral data utilizing crowdsourced spectroscopy data deposited onto ChemSpider.

== Open science advocacy ==
Williams introduced an Open Access journal, the ChemSpider Journal of Chemistry, and the development team provided novel online markup technology (ChemMANTIS – Markup And Nomenclature Transformation Integrated System) to allow crowdsourced markup of chemistry related terms linked up, where possible, to the ChemSpider database. Williams is a judge for the Open Notebook Science Challenge. He promotes the use of Open Data, particularly spectral data, publishes in Open Access journals and is an advocate for Open Notebook Science. Williams is an advocate for freeing pre-clinical data from the pharmaceutical industry on the internet. Williams has worked closely with Sean Ekins to advocate the release of pre-competitive pharmaceutical data to the community. He has also participated in the analysis and review of open pharmaceutical data released to the community.

Williams, himself a longtime contributor to Wikipedia has been vocal in questioning the notability requirements of Wikipedia itself, comparing pornstars and scientists.

== Awards and honors ==
Williams was the winner of the Jim Gray e-Science award in 2012 and the North Carolina American Chemical Society Distinguished Speaker of the Year Award in 2016.
