= History of spectroscopy =

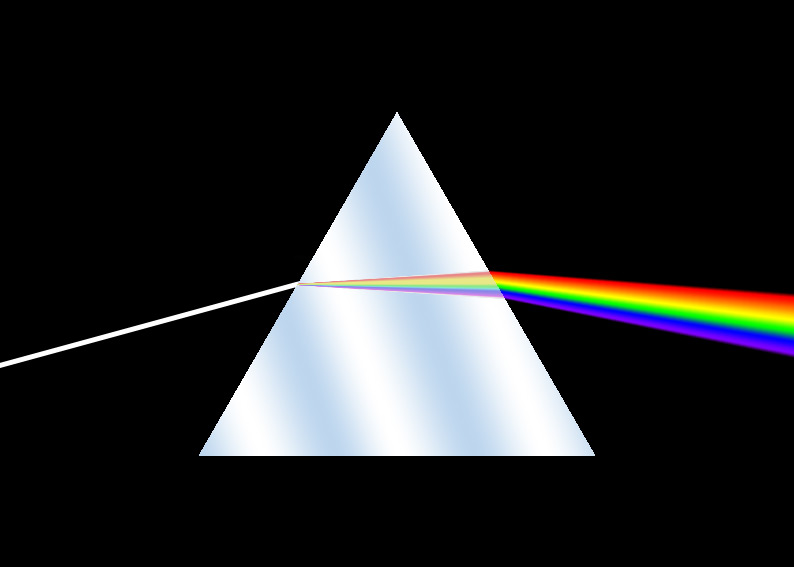
Light separated into a spectrum by refraction through glass prism. Colour dispersion angles exaggerated for visualisation.

Modern spectroscopy in the Western world started in the 17th century. New designs in optics, specifically prisms, enabled systematic observations of the solar spectrum. Isaac Newton first applied the word spectrum to describe the rainbow of colors that combine to form white light. During the early 1800s, Joseph von Fraunhofer conducted experiments with dispersive spectrometers that enabled spectroscopy to become a more precise and quantitative scientific technique. Since then, spectroscopy has played and continues to play a significant role in chemistry, physics and astronomy. Fraunhofer observed and measured dark lines in the Sun's spectrum, which now bear his name although several of them were observed earlier by William Hyde Wollaston.

== Origins and experimental development ==
The Romans were already familiar with the ability of a prism to generate a rainbow of colors. Newton is traditionally regarded as the founder of spectroscopy, but he was not the first scientist who studied and reported on the solar spectrum. The works of Athanasius Kircher (1646), Jan Marek Marci (1648), Robert Boyle (1664), and Francesco Maria Grimaldi (1665), predate Newton's optics experiments (1666–1672). Newton published his experiments and theoretical explanations of dispersion of light in his Opticks. His experiments demonstrated that white light could be split up into component colors by means of a prism and that these components could be recombined to generate white light. He demonstrated that the prism is not imparting or creating the colors but rather separating constituent parts of the white light. Newton's corpuscular theory of light was gradually succeeded by the wave theory. It was not until the 19th century that the quantitative measurement of dispersed light was recognized and standardized. As with many subsequent spectroscopy experiments, Newton's sources of white light included flames and stars, including the Sun. Subsequent studies of the nature of light include those of Robert Hooke, Christiaan Huygens, Thomas Young. Subsequent experiments with prisms provided the first indications that spectra were associated uniquely with chemical constituents. Scientists observed the emission of distinct patterns of colour when salts were added to alcohol flames.

=== Early 19th century (1800–1829) ===
Solar spectrum with Fraunhofer lines as it appears visually.

In 1802, William Hyde Wollaston built a spectrometer, but he observed the spectrum directly with his eye rather than projecting on a screen. Upon use, Wollaston realized that within the colors were dark bands in the sun's spectrum.

In 1815, independently and unaware of Wollaston's paper Joseph von Fraunhofer used a better spectrometer and observed 754 lines now called Fraunhofer lines. Fraunhofer replaced the prism with a diffraction grating as the source of wavelength dispersion. Fraunhofer built off the theories of light interference developed by Thomas Young, François Arago and Augustin-Jean Fresnel. He conducted his own experiments to demonstrate the effect of passing light through a single rectangular slit, two slits, and so forth, eventually developing a means of closely spacing thousands of slits to form a diffraction grating. The interference achieved by a diffraction grating both improves the spectral resolution over a prism and allows for the dispersed wavelengths to be quantified. Fraunhofer's establishment of a quantified wavelength scale paved the way for matching spectra observed in multiple laboratories, from multiple sources (flames and the sun) and with different instruments. Fraunhofer made and published systematic observations of the solar spectrum, and the dark bands he observed and specified the wavelengths of are still known as Fraunhofer lines.

Throughout the early 1800s, a number of scientists pushed the techniques and understanding of spectroscopy forward. In the 1820s, both John Herschel and William H. F. Talbot made systematic observations of salts using flame spectroscopy.

=== Mid-19th century (1830–1869) ===
In 1835, Charles Wheatstone reported that different metals could be easily distinguished by the different bright lines in the emission spectra of their sparks, thereby introducing an alternative mechanism to flame spectroscopy. In 1849, J. B. L. Foucault experimentally demonstrated that absorption and emission lines appearing at the same wavelength are both due to the same material, with the difference between the two originating from the temperature of the light source. In 1853, the Swedish physicist Anders Jonas Ångström presented observations and theories about gas spectra in his work Optiska Undersökningar (Optical investigations) to the Royal Swedish Academy of Sciences. Ångström postulated that an incandescent gas emits luminous rays of the same wavelength as those it can absorb. Ångström was unaware of Foucalt's experimental results. At the same time George Stokes and William Thomson (Kelvin) were discussing similar postulates. Ångström also measured the emission spectrum from hydrogen later labeled the Balmer lines. In 1854 and 1855, David Alter published observations on the spectra of metals and gases, including an independent observation of the Balmer lines of hydrogen.

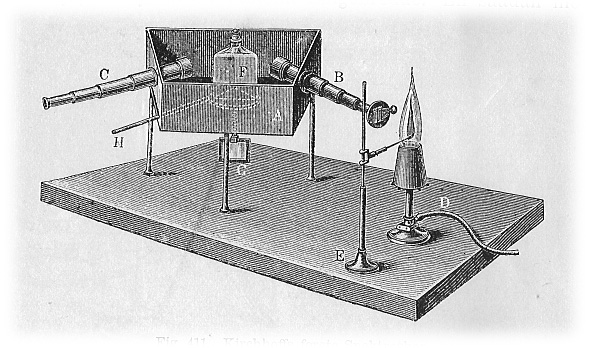
Spectroscope of Kirchhoff and Bunsen

The systematic attribution of spectra to chemical elements began in the 1860s with the work of German physicists Robert Bunsen and Gustav Kirchhoff, who found that Fraunhofer lines correspond to emission spectral lines observed in laboratory light sources. This laid way for spectrochemical analysis in laboratory and astrophysical science. Bunsen and Kirchhoff applied the optical techniques of Fraunhofer, Bunsen's improved flame source and a highly systematic experimental procedure to a detailed examination of the spectra of chemical compounds. They established the linkage between chemical elements and their unique spectral patterns. In the process, they established the technique of analytical spectroscopy. In 1860, they published their findings on the spectra of eight elements and identified these elements' presence in several natural compounds. They demonstrated that spectroscopy could be used for trace chemical analysis and several of the chemical elements they discovered were previously unknown. Kirchhoff and Bunsen also definitively established the link between absorption and emission lines, including attributing solar absorption lines to particular elements based on their corresponding spectra. Kirchhoff went on to contribute fundamental research on the nature of spectral absorption and emission, including what is now known as Kirchhoff's law of thermal radiation. Kirchhoff's applications of this law to spectroscopy are captured in three laws of spectroscopy:

1. An incandescent solid, liquid or gas under high pressure emits a continuous spectrum.
2. A hot gas under low pressure emits a "bright-line" or emission-line spectrum.
3. A continuous spectrum source viewed through a cool, low-density gas produces an absorption-line spectrum.

In the 1860s the husband-and-wife team of William and Margaret Huggins used spectroscopy to determine that the stars were composed of the same elements as found on earth. They also used the non-relativistic Doppler shift (redshift) equation on the spectrum of the star Sirius in 1868 to determine its axial speed. They were the first to take a spectrum of a planetary nebula when the Cat's Eye Nebula (NGC 6543) was analyzed. Using spectral techniques, they were able to distinguish nebulae from stars.

August Beer observed a relationship between light absorption and concentration and created the color comparator which was later replaced by a more accurate device called the spectrophotometer.

=== Late 19th century (1870–1899) ===
In the 19th century new developments such as the discovery of photography, Rowland's invention of the concave diffraction grating, and Schumann's works on discovery of vacuum ultraviolet (fluorite for prisms and lenses, low-gelatin photographic plates and absorption of UV in air below 185 nm) made advance to shorter wavelengths very fast. In 1871, Stoney suggested using a wavenumber scale for spectra and Hartley followed up, finding constant wave-number differences in the triplets of zinc. Liveing and Dewar observed that alkali spectra appeared to form a series and Alfred Cornu found similar structure in the spectra of thallium and aluminum, setting the stage for Balmer to discover a relation connecting wavelengths in the visible hydrogen spectrum. In 1890, Kayser and Runge organized the series reported by Liveing and Dewar using names like 'Principal', 'diffuse', and 'sharp' series. Rydberg gave a formula for wave-numbers of all spectral series of all the alkalis and hydrogen.

In 1895, the German physicist Wilhelm Conrad Röntgen discovered and extensively studied X-rays, which were later used in X-ray spectroscopy. One year later, in 1896, French physicist Antoine Henri Becquerel discovered radioactivity, and Dutch physicist Pieter Zeeman observed spectral lines being split by a magnetic field.

In 1897, theoretical physicist, Joseph Larmor explained the splitting of the spectral lines in a magnetic field by the oscillation of electrons.

Physicist, Joseph Larmor, created the first solar system model of the atom in 1897. He also postulated the proton, calling it a "positive electron." He said the destruction of this type of atom making up matter "is an occurrence of infinitely small probability."

=== Early 20th century (1900–1950) ===
The first decade of the 20th century brought the basics of quantum theory (Planck, Einstein) and interpretation of spectral series of hydrogen by Lyman in VUV and by Paschen in infrared. Ritz formulated the combination principle.

John William Nicholson had created an atomic model in 1912, a year before Niels Bohr, that was both nuclear and quantum in which he showed that electron oscillations in his atom matched the solar and nebular spectral lines. Bohr had been working on his atom during this period, but Bohr's model had only a single ground state and no spectra until he incorporated the Nicholson model and referenced the Nicholson papers in his model of the atom.

In 1913, Bohr formulated his quantum mechanical model of atom. This stimulated empirical term analysis. Bohr published a theory of the hydrogen-like atoms that could explain the observed wavelengths of spectral lines due to electrons transitioning from different energy states. In 1937 "E. Lehrer created the first fully-automated spectrometer" to help more accurately measure spectral lines. With the development of more advanced instruments such as photo-detectors scientists were then able to more accurately measure specific wavelength absorption of substances.

== Development of quantum mechanics ==
Between 1920 and 1930 fundamental concepts of quantum mechanics were developed by Pauli, Heisenberg, Schrödinger, and Dirac. Understanding of the spin and exclusion principle allowed conceiving how electron shells of atoms are filled with the increasing atomic number.

== Multiply ionized atoms ==
This branch of spectroscopy deals with radiation related to atoms that are stripped of several electrons (multiply ionized atoms (MIA), multiply charged ions, highly charged ions). These are observed in very hot plasmas (laboratory or astrophysical) or in accelerator experiments (beam-foil, electron beam ion trap (EBIT)). The lowest exited electron shells of such ions decay into stable ground states producing photons in VUV, EUV and soft X-ray spectral regions (so-called resonance transitions).

=== Structure studies ===
Further progress in studies of atomic structure was in tight connection with the advance to shorter wavelength in EUV region. Millikan, Sawyer, Bowen used electric discharges in vacuum to observe some emission spectral lines down to 13 nm they prescribed to stripped atoms. In 1927 Osgood and Hoag reported on grazing incidence concave grating spectrographs and photographed lines down to 4.4 nm (K_{α} of carbon). Dauvillier used a fatty acid crystal of large crystal grating space to extend soft x-ray spectra up to 12.1 nm, and the gap was closed. In the same period Manne Siegbahn constructed a very sophisticated grazing incidence spectrograph that enabled Ericson and Edlén to obtain spectra of vacuum spark with high quality and to reliably identify lines of multiply ionized atoms up to O VI, with five stripped electrons. Grotrian developed his graphic presentation of energy structure of the atoms. Russel and Saunders proposed their coupling scheme for the spin-orbit interaction and their generally recognized notation for spectral terms.

=== Accuracy ===
Theoretical quantum-mechanical calculations become rather accurate to describe the energy structure of some simple electronic configurations. The results of theoretical developments were summarized by Condon and Shortley in 1935.

Edlén thoroughly analyzed spectra of MIA for many chemical elements and derived regularities in energy structures of MIA for many isoelectronic sequences (ions with the same number of electrons, but different nuclear charges). Spectra of rather high ionization stages (e.g. Cu XIX) were observed.

The most exciting event was in 1942, when Edlén proved the identification of some solar coronal lines on the basis of his precise analyses of spectra of MIA. This implied that the solar corona has a temperature of a million degrees, and strongly advanced understanding of solar and stellar physics.

After the WW II experiments on balloons and rockets were started to observe the VUV radiation of the Sun. (See X-ray astronomy). More intense research continued since 1960 including spectrometers on satellites.

In the same period the laboratory spectroscopy of MIA becomes relevant as a diagnostic tool for hot plasmas of thermonuclear devices (see Nuclear fusion) which begun with building Stellarator in 1951 by Spitzer, and continued with tokamaks, z-pinches and the laser produced plasmas. Progress in ion accelerators stimulated beam-foil spectroscopy as a means to measure lifetimes of exited states of MIA. Many various data on highly exited energy levels, autoionization and inner-core ionization states were obtained.

=== Electron beam ion trap ===
Simultaneously theoretical and computational approaches provided data necessary for identification of new spectra and interpretation of observed line intensities. New laboratory and theoretical data became very useful for spectral observation in space. It was an upheaval of works on MIA in USA, England, France, Italy, Israel, Sweden, Russia and other countries

A new page in the spectroscopy of MIA may be dated as 1986 with development of EBIT (Levine and Marrs, LLNL) due to a favorable composition of modern high technologies such as cryogenics, ultra-high vacuum, superconducting magnets, powerful electron beams and semiconductor detectors. Very quickly EBIT sources were created in many countries (see NIST summary for many details as well as reviews.)

A wide field of spectroscopic research with EBIT is enabled including achievement of highest grades of ionization (U^{92+}), wavelength measurement, hyperfine structure of energy levels, quantum electrodynamic studies, ionization cross-sections (CS) measurements, electron-impact excitation CS, X-ray polarization, relative line intensities, dielectronic recombination CS, magnetic octupole decay, lifetimes of forbidden transitions, charge-exchange recombination, etc.

== Infrared and Raman spectroscopy ==
Many early scientists who studied the IR spectra of compounds had to develop and build their own instruments to be able to record their measurements making it very difficult to get accurate measurements. During World War II, the U.S. government contracted different companies to develop a method for the polymerization of butadiene to create rubber, but this could only be done through analysis of C4 hydrocarbon isomers. These contracted companies started developing optical instruments and eventually created the first infrared spectrometers. With the development of these commercial spectrometers, Infrared Spectroscopy became a more popular method to determine the "fingerprint" for any molecule. Raman spectroscopy was first observed in 1928 by Sir Chandrasekhara Venkata Raman in liquid substances and also by "Grigory Landsberg and Leonid Mandelstam in crystals". Raman spectroscopy is based on the observation of the raman effect which is defined as "The intensity of the scattered light is dependent on the amount of the polarization potential change". The raman spectrum records light intensity vs. light frequency (wavenumber) and the wavenumber shift is characteristic to each individual compound.

== Laser spectroscopy ==
Laser spectroscopy is a spectroscopic technique that uses lasers to be able determine the emitted frequencies of matter. The laser was invented because spectroscopists took the concept of its predecessor, the maser, and applied it to the visible and infrared ranges of light. The maser was invented by Charles Townes and other spectroscopists to stimulate matter to determine the radiative frequencies that specific atoms and molecules emitted. While working on the maser, Townes realized that more accurate detections were possible as the frequency of the microwave emitted increased. This led to an idea a few years later to use the visible and eventually the infrared ranges of light for spectroscopy that became a reality with the help of Arthur Schawlow. Since then, lasers have gone on to significantly advance experimental spectroscopy. The laser light allowed for much higher precision experiments specifically in the uses of studying collisional effects of light as well as being able to accurately detect specific wavelengths and frequencies of light, allowing for the invention of devices such as laser atomic clocks. Lasers also made spectroscopy that used time methods more accurate by using speeds or decay times of photons at specific wavelengths and frequencies to keep time. Laser spectroscopic techniques have been used for many different applications. One example is using laser spectroscopy to detect compounds in materials. One specific method is called Laser-induced Fluorescence Spectroscopy, and uses spectroscopic methods to be able to detect what materials are in a solid, liquid, or gas, in situ. This allows for direct testing of materials, instead of having to take the material to a lab to figure out what the solid, liquid, or gas is made of.

== See also ==
- List of spectroscopists
- Mass spectrometry
- History of quantum mechanics
