= Open thesis =

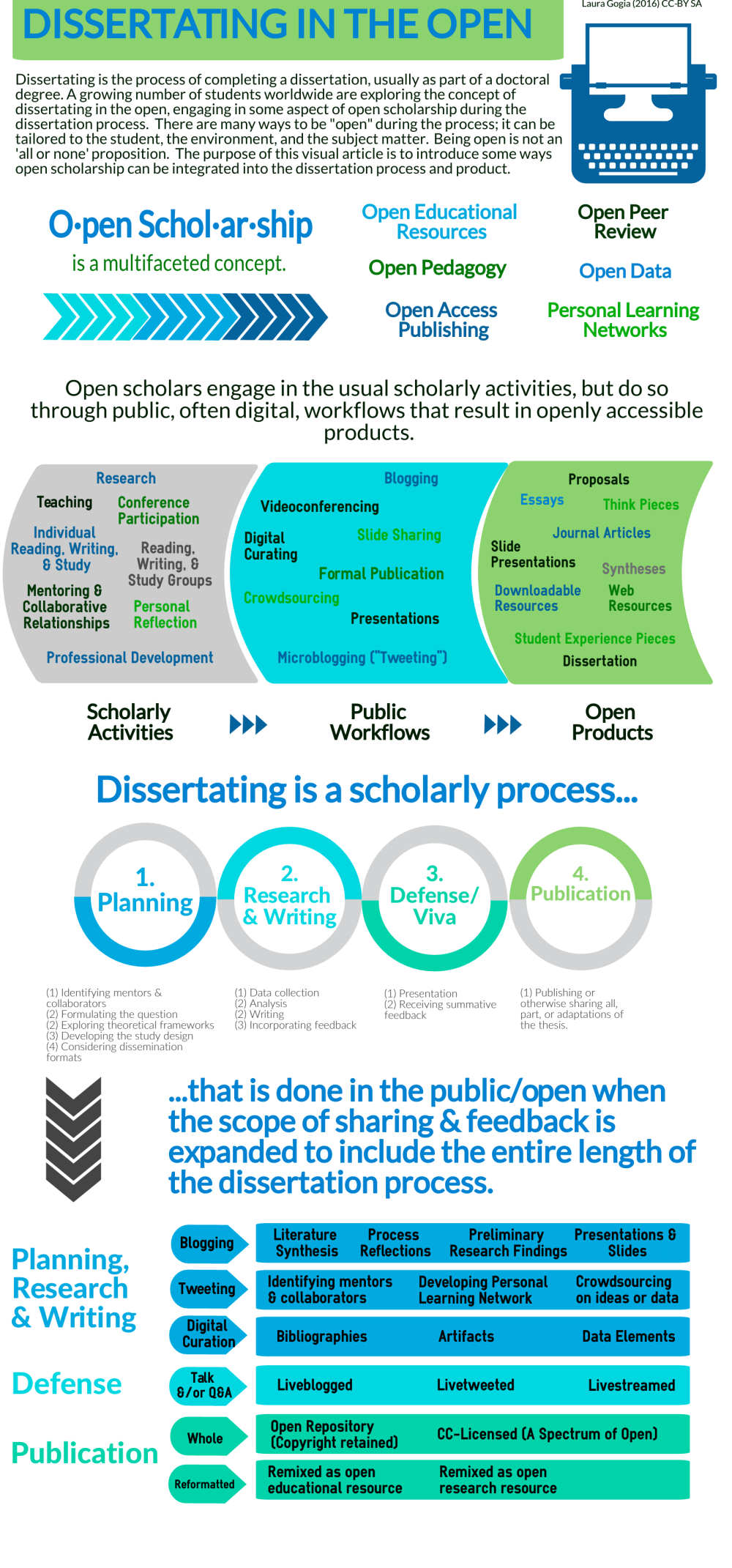
Dissertating in the open, by Laura Gogia

An open thesis, also known as an open dissertation, is a thesis that is freely available for members of the public to access upon publication, and often also during the planning and writing process. The decision to write an open thesis is made by the author, who will usually explain their rationale for creating an open thesis as part of the final published work or while developing it. Writing an open thesis is a process with many decision points regarding where and when to share information openly - from the planning stage, through research and writing, the defense/ voce viva and ultimate publication. Open theses are usually created and located in digital and multimodal formats.

Open theses fall into two categories:

- Those that are available under an open license. Many in this category are also drafted openly, for example they are discussed in public well before submission by way of open notebook science, open data or other elements of open research and open scholarship.
- Those that are freely available as open access publications, but not necessarily under an open license.

== Process and production ==
An individual's decision to create an open thesis is generally made in consultation with a supervisor, committee members, and collaboration in networks of learning such as the Global OER Graduate Network (GO-GN). The process for completing a thesis in the open is individual and context-specific; it is up to the author how much of the process they want to share openly. For example, Doug Belshaw shared the process, the first draft, and the final thesis document; Bonnie Stewart shared her processes openly via her blog, her challenges via Twitter, and her outputs openly; and Chrissi Nerantzi blogged throughout her PhD, sharing the process and outputs as she went along.

== Viva voce ==
In many countries, thesis authors are required to defend their work in front of an examination committee. This gate-keeping event is the final hurdle in the successful completion of a degree of study. In the case of open theses, authors sometimes decide, with the approval of their supervisor and committee members, to present their defense summary, also called a viva voce or viva, publicly. This can be done through live social media messaging or live video streaming. This usually closed session provides time for the candidate to deliver a summary of the "research niche, data collection methods, key findings, and field contributions." The second part of the thesis defense includes a period of questioning by the committee members, which can also be conducted publicly, in the open, with or without being recorded, depending on the approval of the institution and committee members. Those who present their thesis defense in the open will publicly share information on how to engage, and will ask trusted colleagues to manage the additional requirements for an open and public viva. Concerns with open viva voce include issues of knowing or not knowing, scholarly identity, privacy, security, permission, and copyright. Examples of open thesis defense formats include live streaming and live tweeting.

== Repositories ==
The practice of making theses and dissertations available openly online in electronic formats is growing internationally. There are visibility and citation benefits to providing open access to theses. Open theses repositories can be managed and curated by institutions, organizations, or governments.

The following list contains links to databases of openly available theses. Unless specified, the databases include both openly licensed and non-openly licensed theses.

- DART-Europe E-Theses Portal - managed by the University College London (UCL) Library Service. This repository contains over a million research theses from over 500 universities in 29 European countries
- EThOS (E-Theses Online Service) - published by the British Library. EThOS aims to help institutions to meet the expectation of the UK Research Councils that PhDs supported by a Research Council Training Grant should be made freely available in an open access repository
- Open Access Theses and Dissertations (OATD) - this is an index of over 3.5 million electronic theses and dissertations (ETDs). To the extent possible, the index is limited to records of graduate-level theses that are freely available online. The OATD site defines open access broadly to cover ETDs that are free to access and read online. They encourage authors to consider formally specifying use permissions, for example by publishing their theses with a Creative Commons license
- Shodhganga - a repository of open access theses for universities in India, organized in 2010, as a result of the creation of the National Knowledge Commission. Students in participating universities who complete Masters or PhD theses are required to submit a copy for curation. A total of 40,175 theses were curated as of June 30, 2015. Shodhganga encourages the submission of content under Creative Commons Licence Attribution-NonCommercial-ShareAlike 4.0 International (CC BY-NC-SA 4.0).
- Thesis Commons - published by the Center for Open Science. Thesis Commons is "a free, cloud-based, open-source platform for the submission, dissemination, and discovery of graduate and undergraduate theses and dissertations from any discipline. Authors can share their electronic theses and dissertations (ETDs) with a quick and easy submission workflow. Readers can search, discover, and download with a clean and simple interface. Institutions can sign-up for a branded version of the service for their institutional community for hosting ETDs, preprints, or other scholarship"
- Theses Canada - open and searchable repository of dissertations and theses from Canadian, with guidelines provided to universities and higher education institutions on how to submit documents to the Library and Archives Canada organization
- Tuwhera Open Access Theses & Dissertations - published by the Auckland University of Technology (AUT). This repository contains digital copies of theses, dissertations and research projects by postgraduate students at AUT since 2002. Full text files are available where authors have given permission for their works to be available open access

== See also ==
- Open access
- Open science
- Open research
- Open educational resources
- Open educational practices
- Open data
- Open-source software
