= Governor General's Academic Medal =

Canadian academic award

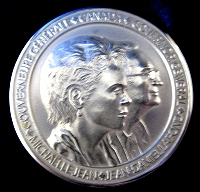
Silver Governor General's Academic Medal

The Governor General's Academic Medal is awarded to the student graduating with the highest grade point average from a Canadian high school, college or university program. They are presented by the educational institution on behalf of the Governor General. These medals are not part of the Canadian Honours System.

== History ==
The medals were created by Lord Dufferin, Canada's third Governor General after Confederation in 1873.

== Criteria ==
To maintain a spirit of universality across the country, the medals are awarded on academic marks only, regardless of the less tangible aspects of the student's life, such as good citizenship, moral behaviour and, volunteer and community work. The Chancellery of Honours administers the Governor General's Academic Medal. Canadian citizenship is not a prerequisite for the award.

== Notable recipients ==
Notable recipients of the medal include:

- Robert Bourassa – Premier of Quebec and Quebec Liberal leader
- Andrée-Anne Dupuis-Bourret – French-Canadian artist
- Jean-Claude Bradley – chemist who coined the term Open Notebook Science
- Kim Campbell – federal Progressive Conservative Leader and Prime Minister
- Robert F. Christy – Canadian-American theoretical physicist who worked on the Manhattan Project
- Adrienne Clarkson – journalist and Governor General of Canada
- Tommy Douglas – Premier of Saskatchewan, leader of the CCF and federal NDP
- Sylvia Fedoruk - Physicist, medical physicist, curler and the 17th Lieutenant Governor of Saskatchewan
- Sylvia Hahn – Canadian artist and head of the art department at the Royal Ontario Museum
- W. G. Hardy – Canadian Classics professor, writer, International Ice Hockey Federation president
- Mabel Gweneth Humphreys – 20th-century Canadian-American mathematician
- Nancy Lane Perham – cell biologist at the University of Cambridge
- Rachel Marsden – journalist, Fox News host, and internationally syndicated columnist
- Gabrielle Roy – French-Canadian author, three-time winner
- Duane Rousselle – Canadian Sociologist and Psychoanalyst
- Robert Stanfield – federal Progressive Conservative Leader and Leader of the Opposition
- Pierre Trudeau – Prime Minister of Canada and federal Liberal Party leader
- Jesse Thistle - Author and Assistant Professor
- Paul Vermeersch – Canadian poet
- Garett Ursu – Jr. Strategy Specialist
- Amir Taheridehkordi – Theoretical Physicist

== Categories ==
Governor General's Academic Medals are awarded at four levels.

- Bronze – secondary school level
- Collegiate Bronze – post-secondary, diploma level
- Silver – undergraduate level
- Gold – graduate level

There is no monetary award associated with the Medal.

== See also ==
- List of awards presented by the governor general of Canada
- Dufferin Medal
