= MITB =

MITB or MitB may refer to:

- Man-in-the-browser, an internet security vulnerability
- Man Is the Bastard, a music band
- Money in the Bank ladder match, a professional wrestling ladder match
- WWE Money in the Bank, a professional wrestling pay-per-view featuring the match type
- Master of IT in Business, a master's degree emphasizing the application of information technology
- "Man in the Box", a song by American grunge band Alice in Chains
