= EBIT =

EBIT, Ebit or ebit may refer to:

- EBIT, or Earnings before interest and taxes, in finance
- EBIT, or Electron beam ion trap, in physics
- An ebit (quantum state), a two-party quantum state with quantum entanglement and the fundamental unit of bipartite entanglement
- Exabit, the symbol for the decimal unit of information storage
