= Forbidden mechanism =

Quantum transitions that are not allowed in the most direct mechanism

In spectroscopy, a forbidden mechanism (forbidden transition or forbidden line) is a spectral line associated with absorption or emission of photons by atomic nuclei, atoms, or molecules which undergo a transition that is not allowed by a particular selection rule but is allowed if the approximation associated with that rule is not made. For example, in a situation where, according to usual approximations (such as the electric dipole approximation for the interaction with light), the process cannot happen, but at a higher level of approximation (e.g. magnetic dipole, or electric quadrupole) the process is allowed but at a low rate.

An example is phosphorescent materials, which absorb light and form an excited state whose decay involves a spin flip, and is therefore forbidden by electric dipole transitions. The result is emission of light slowly over minutes or hours.

Should an atomic nucleus, atom or molecule be raised to an excited state and should the transitions be nominally forbidden, then there is still a small probability of their spontaneous occurrence. More precisely, there is a certain probability that such an excited entity will make a forbidden transition to a lower energy state per unit time; by definition, this probability is much lower than that for any transition permitted or allowed by the selection rules. Therefore, if a state can de-excite via a permitted transition (or otherwise, e.g. via collisions) it will almost certainly do so before any transition occurs via a forbidden route. Nevertheless, most forbidden transitions are only relatively unlikely: states that can only decay in this way (so-called meta-stable states) usually have lifetimes on the order milliseconds to seconds, compared to less than a microsecond for decay via permitted transitions. In some radioactive decay systems, multiple levels of forbiddenness can stretch life times by many orders of magnitude for each additional unit by which the system changes beyond what is most allowed under the selection rules. Such excited states can last years, or even for many billions of years (too long to have been measured).

== In radioactive decay ==
=== Gamma decay ===
The most common mechanism for suppression of the rate of gamma decay of excited atomic nuclei, and thus make possible the existence of a metastable isomer for the nucleus, is lack of a decay route for the excited state that will change nuclear angular momentum (along any given direction) by the most common (allowed) amount of 1 quantum unit $\hbar$ of spin angular momentum. Such a change is necessary to emit a gamma-ray photon, which has a spin of 1 unit in this system. Integral changes of 2, 3, 4, and more units in angular momentum are possible (the emitted photons carry off the additional angular momentum), but changes of more than 1 unit are known as forbidden transitions. Each degree of forbiddenness (additional unit of spin change larger than 1, that the emitted gamma ray must carry) inhibits decay rate by about 5 orders of magnitude. The highest known spin change of 8 units occurs in the decay of Ta-180m, which suppresses its decay by a factor of 10^{35} from that associated with 1 unit, so that instead of a natural gamma decay half-life of 10^{−12} seconds, it has a half-life of more than 10^{23} seconds, or at least 3 × 10^{15} years, and thus has yet to be observed to decay.

Although gamma decays with nuclear angular momentum changes of 2, 3, 4, etc., are forbidden, they are only relatively forbidden, and do proceed, but with a slower rate than the normal allowed change of 1 unit. However, gamma emission is absolutely forbidden when the nucleus begins and ends in a zero-spin state, as such an emission would not conserve angular momentum. These transitions cannot occur by gamma decay, but must proceed by another route, such as beta decay in some cases, or internal conversion where beta decay is not favored.

=== Beta decay ===
Beta decay is classified according to the L-value of the emitted radiation. Unlike gamma decay, beta decay may proceed from a nucleus with a spin of zero and even parity to a nucleus also with a spin of zero and even parity (Fermi transition). This is possible because the electron and neutrino emitted may be of opposing spin (giving a radiation total angular momentum of zero), thus preserving angular momentum of the initial state even if the nucleus remains at spin-zero before and after emission. This type of emission is super-allowed meaning that it is the most rapid type of beta decay in nuclei that are susceptible to a change in proton/neutron ratios that accompanies a beta decay process.

The next possible total angular momentum of the electron and neutrino emitted in beta decay is a combined spin of 1 (electron and neutrino spinning in the same direction), and is allowed. This type of emission (Gamow-Teller transition) changes nuclear spin by 1 to compensate. States involving higher angular momenta of the emitted radiation (2, 3, 4, etc.) are forbidden and are ranked in degree of forbiddenness by their increasing angular momentum.

Specifically, when L > 0 the decay is referred to as forbidden. Nuclear selection rules require L-values greater than two to be accompanied by changes in both nuclear spin (J) and parity (π). The selection rules for the Lth forbidden transitions are

$$\Delta J = L-1, L, L+1; \Delta \pi = (-1)^L,$$

where Δπ = 1 or −1 corresponds to no parity change or parity change, respectively. As noted, the special case of a Fermi 0^{+} → 0^{+} transition (which in gamma decay is absolutely forbidden) is referred to as super-allowed for beta decay, and proceeds very quickly if beta decay is possible. The following table lists the ΔJ and Δπ values for the first few values of L:

Forbiddenness	ΔJ	Δπ
Superallowed	0^{+} → 0^{+}	no
Allowed	0, 1	no
First forbidden	0, 1, 2	yes
Second forbidden	1, 2, 3	no
Third forbidden	2, 3, 4	yes

As with gamma decay, each degree of increasing forbiddenness increases the half-life of the beta decay process involved by a factor of about 4 to 5 orders of magnitude.

Double beta decay has been observed in the laboratory, e.g. in ^{82}Se. Geochemical experiments have also found this rare type of forbidden decay in several isotopes, with mean half lives over 10^{18} yr.

== In solid-state physics ==
Forbidden transitions in rare earth atoms such as erbium and neodymium make them useful as dopants for solid-state lasing media. In such media, the atoms are held in a matrix which keeps them from de-exciting by collision, and the long half-life of their excited states makes them easy to optically pump to create a large population of excited atoms. Neodymium doped glass derives its unusual coloration from forbidden f-f transitions within the neodymium atom, and is used in extremely high power solid state lasers. Bulk semiconductor transitions can also be forbidden by symmetry, which change the functional form of the absorption spectrum, as can be shown in a Tauc plot.

== In astrophysics and atomic physics ==
Photon energies for orbital transitions of doubly-ionized oxygen [O III], include forbidden transitions (green)

Forbidden emission lines have been observed in extremely low-density gases and plasmas, either in outer space or in the extreme upper atmosphere of the Earth. In space environments, densities may be only a few atoms per cubic centimetre, making atomic collisions unlikely. Under such conditions, once an atom or molecule has been excited for any reason into a meta-stable state, then it is almost certain to decay by emitting a forbidden-line photon. Since meta-stable states are rather common, forbidden transitions account for a significant percentage of the photons emitted by the ultra-low density gas in space. Forbidden transitions in highly charged ions resulting in the emission of visible, vacuum-ultraviolet, soft x-ray and x-ray photons are routinely observed in certain laboratory devices such as electron beam ion traps and ion storage rings, where in both cases residual gas densities are sufficiently low for forbidden line emission to occur before atoms are collisionally de-excited. Using laser spectroscopy techniques, forbidden transitions are used to stabilize atomic clocks and quantum clocks that have the highest accuracies currently available.

Forbidden lines of nitrogen ([N II] at 654.8 and 658.4 nm), sulfur ([S II] at 671.6 and 673.1 nm), and oxygen ([O II] at 372.7 nm, and [O III] at 495.9 and 500.7 nm) are commonly observed in astrophysical plasmas. These lines are important to the energy balance of planetary nebulae and H II regions. The forbidden 21-cm hydrogen line is particularly important for radio astronomy as it allows very cold neutral hydrogen gas to be seen. Also, the presence of [O I] and [S II] forbidden lines in the spectra of T-tauri stars implies low gas density.

=== Notation ===
Forbidden line transitions are noted by placing square brackets around the atomic or molecular species in question, e.g. [O III] or [S II].
