= Sandwich degree =

Higher education course including practical work experience

A sandwich degree, or sandwich course, is an academic degree or higher education course (also known as tertiary education) involving practical work experience in addition to academic study. The work experience is often referred as an industrial placement or internship. Many universities offer sandwich degrees.

== Definition ==
In the United Kingdom, a thick sandwich degree is either a four-year undergraduate course as part of a bachelor's degree, or a five-year postgraduate course as part of a master's degree, and involves a placement year or internship in industry, that is, a sandwich year, normally after the second year at university. A thin sandwich degree involves multiple shorter placement or internship periods rather than an unbroken year.

Similar types of degrees or courses are offered in other countries, particularly France and other Francophone countries.

Placement years are often offered by industrial companies as a route to recruiting graduate employees.

== History ==
The concept was pioneered by Alexander Russell, a Scottish electrical engineer and educator, in the early 20th century. It was articulated in a 1945 report by the Ministry of Education in the United Kingdom which advocated those attending courses at technical colleges would receive a new kind of education in which theoretical studies and industrial training would be interwoven. The term "sandwich" was used in a 1950 National Advisory Council on Education for Industry and Commerce report on possible developments within the further education sector. During the early 1950s, sandwich course proposals were formulated involving the close association of industry and colleges, encouraging movement of students and researchers between academia and industry. Growth of sandwich courses was encouraged by a Ministry of Education white paper on Technical Education 1956.

The Newcastle Polytechnic Bachelor of Arts degree in "Design for Industry" starting in 1953 was an early example of this kind, formerly a three-year "Industrial Design" degree. The new course with two additional terms for industrial placements, extended the degree to four years and popularised the term "sandwich course".

At what is now Brunel University, Marie Jahoda was involved in establishing psychology degree programmes including a four-year, thin-sandwich degree between 1958 and 1965. Architectural education in the United Kingdom saw the introduction of sandwich courses in the 1960s. Engineering education sometimes includes industry placement. Non-degree courses include those provided by Air Service Training. Over time, sandwich courses became widespread in the United Kingdom.

Sandwich courses are widespread in France, and also exist in other countries such as Australia, Denmark (Royal School of Library and Information Science), India, Norway (optometry) and several countries in French-influenced Africa (Françafrique), including Cameroon, the Democratic Republic of the Congo and the Republic of the Congo, Ghana and Nigeria.

Some specific courses offered internationally are typically sandwich courses, such as Master of IT in Business.

=== Alumni ===
Alumni of the Newcastle Polytechnic Bachelor of Arts degree in "Design for Industry" include Rick Dickinson of Sinclair and Jony Ive of Apple.

Alumni of sandwich courses at other universities include: Nicola Pellow of Leicester Polytechnic (now De Montfort University) who was involved in work on the World Wide Web in the early 1990s; Nigel McGuinness who studied at the University of Leicester and became a professional wrestler; Veronica German, a politician, who studied at the University of Birmingham; Olga FitzRoy, an audio engineer and campaigner who studied at the University of Surrey; Paul Walsh who studied at Manchester Polytechnic and became the chief executive of Diageo; Alex Cartañá, a British-Spanish singer-songwriter and actress who studied at the University of Westminster; Russell Deacon who works in governance and policy and studied at the University Glamorgan; Sean Ekins, a pharmacologist who studied at Nottingham Trent Polytechnic, now Nottingham Trent University; Bunmi Olaye who studied at University of East London and founded a luxury fashion brand, Bunmi Koko; Lorraine Gradwell studied a degree in Fashion Design and Management at Middlesbrough Art College and Hollins College in Manchester; Colin Larkin who studied typography and book design at the London College of Printing, now the London College of Communication; several alumni of Aston University; and Élise Delzenne a French former professional road and track racing cyclist who studied at ENSAIT in France.

== Popularity ==
During 1989 in the United Kingdom, about 20% of the students in higher education were on sandwich courses. By 2002 this had dropped to 9.5 percent and by 2010 7.2 percent. Enrollments were growing again by 2014/15.

== See also ==
- Council for National Academic Awards
- Industry-oriented education
- Polytechnic (United Kingdom)
- Universities in the United Kingdom
