= List of spectroscopists =

Articles about notable spectroscopists.

== A ==
- William de Wiveleslie Abney
- David Alter
- Anders Jonas Ångström

== B ==
- Roman Balabin
- Johann Balmer
- G. Michael Bancroft
- Charles Glover Barkla
- Nikolay Basov
- Jane Blankgen
- Niels Bohr
- Frederick Sumner Brackett (1896–1988), discovered the hydrogen Brackett series.
- Bertram Brockhouse
- John Browning
- Robert Bunsen

== C ==
- Miguel A. Catalán (1894–1957)
- Arthur Compton
- William Crookes
- Robert Curl
- Clair Cameron Patterson

== D ==
- Louis de Broglie
- Peter Debye

== E ==
- Richard R. Ernst

== F ==
- Edward Robert Festing
- James Franck
- Willis H. Flygare

== G ==
- Roy J. Glauber
- Walter Gordy
- G. V. Pawan Kumar

== H ==
- August Hagenbach
- John L. Hall
- Theodor W. Hänsch
- Werner Heisenberg
- Brian Henderson (physicist)
- John Herschel
- William Herschel
- Gerhard Herzberg
- Victor Francis Hess
- Antony Hewish
- William Huggins

== J ==
- Derek Jackson (1906–1982), made the first spectroscopic determination of a nuclear magnetic spin.
- Pierre Janssen

== K ==
- Michael Kasha
- Alfred Kastler
- Gustav Kirchhoff
- Harry Kroto

== L ==
- Willis Eugene Lamb
- George Downing Liveing (1827–1924)
- Norman Lockyer
- Derek Long
- Hendrik Lorentz
- Theodore Lyman

== M ==
- Alfred Maddock
- Gary E. Martin
- Thomas Melvill
- Allan Merchant, spectral properties of the Baslescu-Lenard Equation
- Robert Andrews Millikan
- Edward Morley
- Rudolf Mössbauer

== P ==
- August Herman Pfund (1879–1949), discovered the Pfund hydrogen spectral series.
- Max Planck (1858–1947)
- Bill Price
- Aleksandr Mikhailovich Prokhorov

== R ==
- Isidor Isaac Rabi
- Sir Chandrasekhara Venkata Raman
- Norman Foster Ramsey Jr.
- Carl David Tolmé Runge (1856–1927), Runge–Kutta method, Runge's phenomenon, Laplace–Runge–Lenz vector
- Johannes Rydberg
- Martin Ryle

== S ==
- Sérgio Pereira da Silva Porto
- Victor Schumann (1841–1913), discovered the vacuum ultraviolet.
- Arthur Leonard Schawlow
- Angelo Secchi
- Kai Siegbahn
- Manne Siegbahn
- Richard Smalley
- Johannes Stark
- Miriam Michael Stimson (1913–2002), pioneered the KBr disk technique for Infrared spectroscopy of solid compounds.

== T ==
- William Fox Talbot
- Matthew Pothen Thekaekara
- Charles Hard Townes

== V ==
- Joseph von Fraunhofer
- Philipp Eduard Anton von Lenard

== W ==
- Charles Wheatstone
- Kurt Wüthrich

== X ==
- Xiaoliang Sunney Xie, (born 1962), chemist at Harvard University, pioneer in the field of single molecule microscopy and coherent anti-Stokes Raman spectroscopy microscopy.

== Y ==
- Charles Augustus Young (1834–1908), solar spectroscopist astronomer.

== Z ==
- Pieter Zeeman
- Ahmed Zewail

== See also ==
- List of chemists
- List of physicists
