= Andrée-Anne Dupuis-Bourret =

Canadian artist

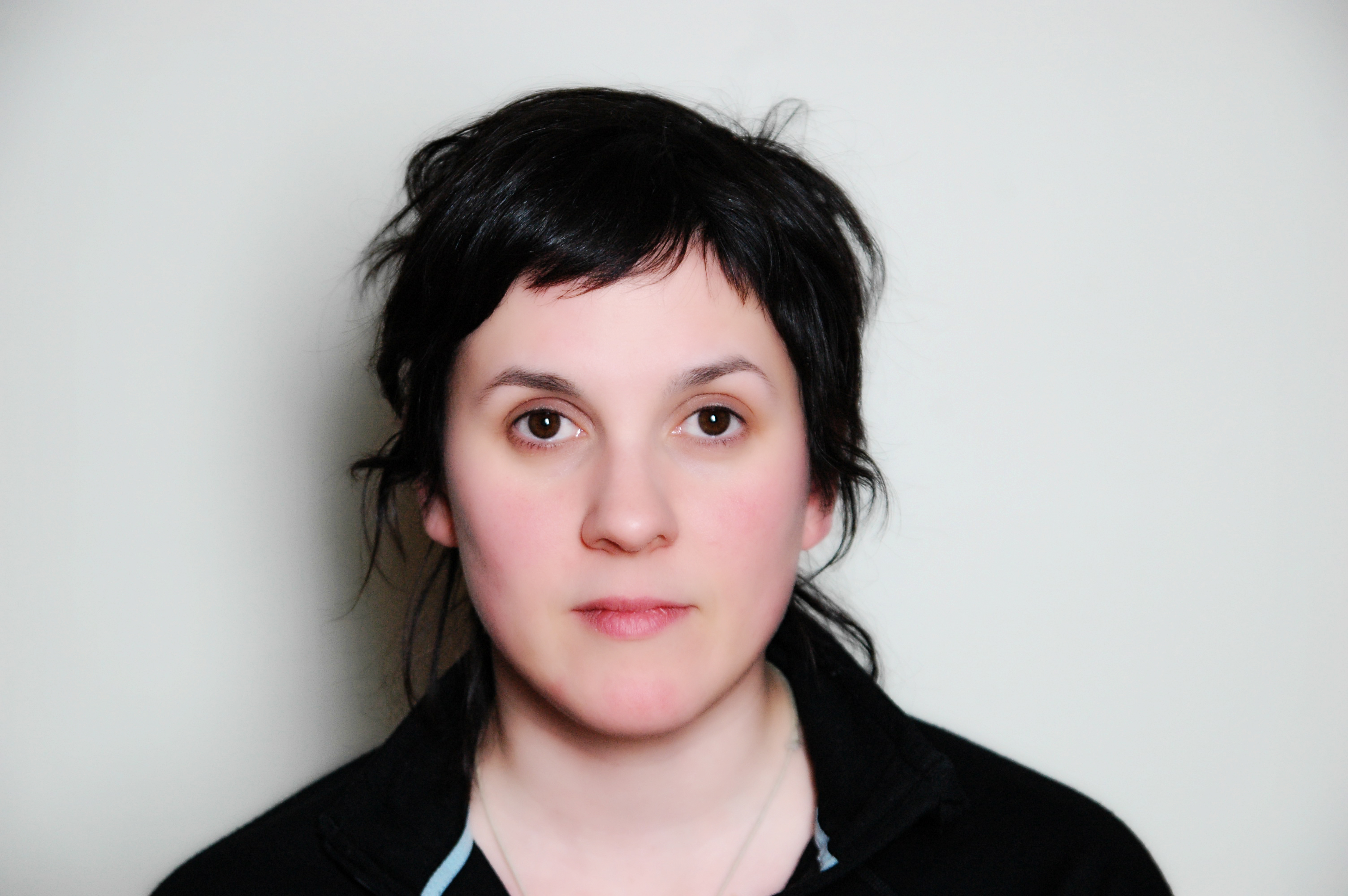
- Born: 1978 (age 47–48); Granby, Quebec
- Known for: Artist

Andrée-Anne Dupuis-Bourret is a Canadian artist. Dupuis-Bourret has multiple exhibitions in Canada as well as internationally. She is a tenured professor at the Université du Québec à Montréal.

Dupuis-Bourret is a recipient of the Governor General's Academic Medal.
