= Massive online open research =

Massive online open research (MOOR) is an online research and development (R&D) open access platform or higher education study program aiming at unlimited participation via the internet.

It may be used to create, on a very large participative scale, a new discovery, development or creation which will be allegedly accompanied by a peer-review publication.

== As a higher education online research program ==
In September 2013, The University of California, San Diego bioinformatics department, proposed a massive online open course which would feature "an opportunity (for students) to work on specific research projects under the leadership of prominent bioinformatics scientists".

== As an online internet platform ==
Several internet platforms have shown their interest in bridging prominent science, technology, engineering and mathematics (i.e., STEM fields) researchers with students, as means to accelerate STEM discoveries and education. The internet social network Research Gate has unveiled that multiple discoveries and advancements in science have been made collaboratively in an open access scheme since its creation, essentially serving as a MOOR platform.

The University of Amsterdam has been developing an online tool for massive online open research since February 2014. This tool will primarily focus on collaborative (qualitative) data analysis.

== See also ==
=== General topics ===
- Massive online open course
- Open science
- Open access
- Open education
- Open research
