= Gary E. Martin =

American chemist

Gary Martin
- Born: Wilkinsburg, Pennsylvania, United States
- Education: University of Kentucky; University of Pittsburgh
- Known for: NMR Spectroscopy; Medicinal Chemistry
- Scientific career
- Fields: Chemistry; Spectroscopy; Medicinal Chemistry
- Workplaces: Merck Research Laboratories
- Doctoral advisor: George A. Digenis

Gary Martin is an American chemist and expert in the fields of both NMR spectroscopy and medicinal chemistry. He is a distinguished fellow at the Merck Research Laboratories. He is also a photographer specializing in the capture of images of lighthouses, especially under conditions of extreme weather.

== Career ==
Martin holds a B.S. in Pharmacy from the University of Pittsburgh and a Ph.D. degree in Medicinal Chemistry/Pharmaceutical Sciences from the University of Kentucky. He was a Professor of Medicinal Chemistry at the University of Houston from 1975–1989 and the director of the University of Houston NMR Facility between 1984–1989. He moved to the pharmaceutical industry in 1989 and worked at a number of pharmaceutical companies as described below. He has published more than 275 papers, invited reviews, and chapters and is a frequently invited lecturer at national and international NMR meetings.

Between 1989 and 1995 he worked at Burroughs Wellcome (later GlaxoSmithKline) (see reference 3) and worked on the development of new one- and two-dimensional NMR experiments for the solution of complex structural and spectral assignment problems. He developed new methods for the acquisition of submicromole and sub-nanomole NMR data for molecular structure characterization, especially work involving inverse-detected heteronuclear shift correlation techniques. These efforts led to collaborative development with Nalorac Cryogenics Corp. to develop micro inverse detection probes which facilitated the acquisition of HMQC spectra on samples to the level of 0.05 μmole for small (200-500 Da) molecule NMR.

He moved to the Pharmacia corporation between 1996–2003 and ran the Rapid Structure Characterization Group. When Pharmacia was acquired by Pfizer, he served as the senior scientific consultant working on new methods development. He led the development of applications of unsymmetrical indirect covariance NMR, initially in an effort to eliminate artifacts and subsequently in the investigation of the mathematical combination of discretely-acquired 2D NMR data. The time savings for the latter was nearly a factor of 16 in time, with a 10-fold improvement in signal-to-noise ratios vs. directly acquiring an HSQC-TOCSY data set with the same sample. He conducted preliminary investigations into the utilization of indirect covariance NMR spectroscopy as an alternative means of evaluating NMR data for structure characterization and Computer-Assisted Structure Elucidation. He collaborated with a team of scientists at Advanced Chemistry Development, ACD/Labs, led by Antony John Williams, investigating the development of computational methods for automated structure verification and structure elucidation. He developed "accordion-optimized" long-range heteronuclear shift correlation methods to provide experimental access to small long-range heteronuclear couplings for the characterization of proton-"deficient" molecular structures, to experimentally access 4J heteronuclear couplings, to differentiate two-bond from three-bond long-range couplings to protonated carbons, to measure long-range heteronuclear couplings and to provide a reliable means of observing long-range proton-nitrogen correlations without concern for the variability of long-range proton nitrogen coupling constants.

He also collaborated on the development of a new generation of sub-micro inverse detection probes with Nalorac Cryogenics Corporation designed to allow heteronuclear shift correlation experiments to be performed at levels down to 0.01 μmole for small molecules. The collaboration extended to a new generation of cold metal (at temperatures of 8K) 3 mm micro inverse detection probes. In 2006 he joined Schering-Plough and was responsible for the chemical structure characterization of impurities and degradants of candidate drug molecules in support of chemical process research. Schering Plough was acquired by Merck Research Laboratories in 2009. During his time at Merck he has continued to explore the limits of detection for low level samples by heteronuclear 2D NMR using newly developed 1.7 mm Micro CryoProbe™ technology. He has developed, in collaboration with ACD/Labs, and Bruker, unsymmetrical indirect covariance NMR spectroscopy, exploring the calculation of hyphenated heteronuclear 2D correlation spectra. He has also continued collaborative investigations in the area of Computer-Assisted Structure Elucidation (CASE) with ACD/Labs. He has also explored the use of unsymmetrical indirect covariance NMR processing methods to define 13C-15N and 13C-13C heteronuclear connectivity networks.

He was named a 2016 Distinguished Graduate Alumnus of the University of Kentucky College of Pharmacy He was the 2016 recipient of the James N. Shoolery Award to recognize individual contributions in the field of small molecule NMR He was awarded the 2016 EAS Award for Outstanding Achievements in NMR.

== Research interests ==
His ongoing research interests have centered on the development of new NMR methods for the characterization of impurities and degradants of pharmaceuticals focusing on the exploration of new NMR probe technologies for the characterization of extremely small samples using heteronuclear 2D-NMR methods. His interests in this area were pivotal in the development of 3 mm and 1.7 mm probe technologies and he was also an early proponent of cryogenic probe capabilities.,

He has had a long-standing interest in heteronuclear NMR and 2D long-range heteronuclear shift correlation in particular. He was among the first to exploit natural abundance long-range 1H-15N heteronuclear shift correlation experiments, those early reports leading to hundreds of published reports that are the subject of multiple reviews and chapters., More recently, his research interests have also led to the development of unsymmetrical indirect covariance NMR processing methods that have the potential for significant spectrometer time savings when experimental access to hyphenated 2D NMR. These methods also provide access to 13C-15N Heteronuclear Single Quantum Coherence-Heteronuclear Multiple Bond Coherence (HSQC-HMBC) correlation data that are experimentally inaccessible at natural abundance, and to HSQC-ADEQUATE correlation plots that allow carbon-carbon connectivity networks of molecules to be mapped without having to resort to the highly insensitive 13C-13C INADEQUATE experiment. In recent years Martin has extended his work into the application of residual dipolar couplings, residual chemical shift anisotropy and DFT calculations to demonstrate that, in combination, some of the most complex chemical structures could be elucidated and making unambiguous assignment essentially difficult or impossible.
