= Jean-Claude Bradley =

Chemist and open science advocate

- Bradley at The White House - June 2013
- Died: May 2014
- Education: Laurentian University; University of Ottawa
- Known for: Open Notebook Science
- Awards: Blue Obelisk award; Silver Academic Medal of the Governor-General of Canada, 1989; CIC Silver Medal in Chemistry, 1988
- Scientific career
- Fields: Chemistry
- Workplaces: Drexel University; Duke University
- Thesis: The synthesis and reactivity of 2-benzylidenebenzocyclobutenones and derivatives (1993)
- Doctoral advisor: Tony Durst

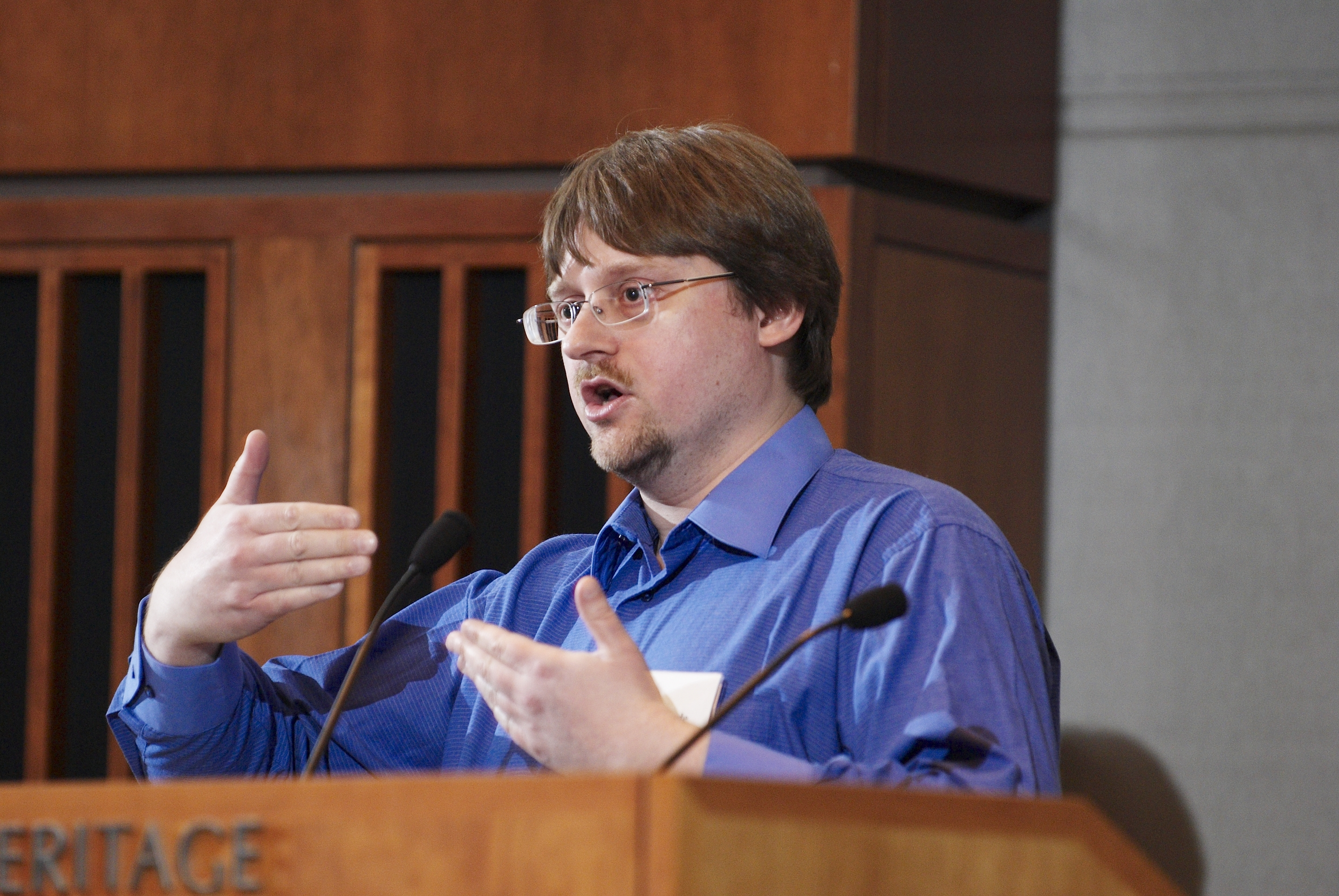
Jean-Claude Bradley, 2008

Jean-Claude Bradley was a chemist who actively promoted Open Science in chemistry, including at the White House, for which he was awarded the Blue Obelisk award in 2007. He coined the term "Open Notebook science". He died in May 2014. A memorial symposium was held July 14, 2014 at Cambridge University, UK.

One outcome of his Open Notebook work is the collection of physicochemical properties of organic compounds he was studying. All of this data he made available as Open data under the CCZero license. For example, in 2009 Bradley et al. published their work on making solubility data of organic compounds available as Open data. Later, the melting point data set he collaborated on with Andrew Lang and Antony Williams was published with Figshare. Both data sets were also made available as books via the Lulu.com self-publishing platform.

He blogged extensively and contributed to at least 25 individual blogs. In an interview in 2008 with Bora Zivkovic titled "Doing Science Publicly", he spoke of his work and online presence. In 2010, he gave an extensive interview about the impact of Open Notebook science with Richard Poynder.
