= Sci-Mate =

Sci-Mate was a proposal for an open collaboration of scientists using Web 2.0 software to address well known challenges in academic publishing and technology transfer. The site provided free access to a collection of Web 2.0 software applications intended to make it easier for researchers and developers to bring together the necessary knowledge, tools and people for productive research and/or development.

A demo version of the site was launched in April 2009, which included software supporting Articles, Discussion, Embedding and Item Exchange. Prior to launch the site was reviewed by The Australian and on ABC's Future Tense program. More recently the site was described in the December 2009 issue of the European Journal of Immunology in the lead up to the 1st Virtual Immunology Conference (VIC 2010).

The site's terms and conditions state that it is research, not profit, oriented, and is intended to be owned, controlled and run by its community of research scientist members.

== Articles ==
Articles on sci-mate used Web 2.0 solutions for scientists to put their knowledge initially into open access articles, which can be ultimately published in 'traditional' formats. Sci-Mate articles recorded authorship and an automatic claim of copyright on behalf of contributors instantly protects the rights of original content. Owners of IP could define their own licenses, but grant permission for editors to manage content within articles to simplify publication issues. When content was of sufficient standard, an interactive review process allowed other scientists to provide quality control prior to submission.

== Discussion ==
A Simple Machines Forum was integrated into the site to allow researchers to quickly clarify issues or disseminate information that is not intended for publication.

== Item Exchange ==
The Material Transfer Environment (MaTE) is intended to allow researchers to clearly describe any item that might be of interest to other researchers and developers and the conditions of supply. The sort of items described that could be listed on the site include: research tools, such as antibodies, plasmids, software, equipment, cell lines, animal models, etc.; services, such as assays, consultancies, analysis, customized products, etc.; technology transfer; items wanted; project proposals; grants and funding opportunities; jobs; training opportunities; conferences; and seminars. As well as allowing suppliers to define conditions up-front through a material transfer agreement, suppliers can also issue restricted users licenses to avoid unhealthy competition.

Once an item is listed, the software should help researchers manage interactions, answer questions, evaluate requests and distribute material. The software provides tools for IP management in the form of records, reports and data-flows to researchers, administrative staff and other controlling interests. This makes it possible for researchers to initiate the commercial distribution of items, although employers can appoint administrators to monitor and take over distribution at any time to ensure the best return for the researcher and other controlling interests.

== Embedded ==
The site allowed for embedded web content, such as software applications or informative video or text content, along with descriptive text. Ratings and reviews help sort content by relevance to researchers.
