= Open Notebook Science Challenge =

PCA Chemical Space for Ethanol

Descriptor Chemical Space for THF: ALOGP vs. MW

The Open Notebook Science Challenge is a crowdsourcing research project which collects measurements of the non-aqueous solubility of organic compounds and publishes these as open data; findings are reported in an open notebook science manner. Although anyone may contribute research data, the competition is only open to post-secondary students in the US and UK.

The challenge in turn forms part of the UsefulChem project, an ongoing open notebook science effort to synthesize and screen potential new anti-malarial drugs. Data from the Solubility Challenge will be used to build predictive computational models of solubility for use in optimising syntheses.

The challenge began on September 28, 2008 and, as of February 2014, involves researchers and their students from at least 4 different institutions and has resulted in the acquisition of over 7672 solubility measurements.

== Prizes ==
To encourage participation, each month an award is given to the student who does, in the opinion of the judges, the best work. In order to participate, students have to be a US or UK resident. The award is a US$500 cash prize. The first three winners also received a year's subscription to the journal Nature. The awards are sponsored by Submeta and Nature.

== Request an experiment ==
As well as concentrating on compounds related to the Ugi reaction, the ONSchallenge allows anyone to request a solubility measurement experiment.

== Chemical donations ==
Sigma Aldrich is also an official sponsor of the Open Notebook Science Challenge. Sigma Aldrich is participating by donating and shipping requested chemicals to any experimenters in the US or UK for free.
