= Master of IT in Business =

The Master of IT in Business (MITB) is a master's degree emphasizing on the application of information technology to create business impact and value. The MITB degree originated in the early 21st century as the digital transformation of businesses took place leaving industries to compete with each other on their technological capacity and advancement. The MITB is typically a sandwich course of two distinct horizontals targeted at providing a holistic view and understanding of both technology and management alike. The MITB offers a more specialized and niche course selection for technology and business education aspirants alike. Students on completion of such degrees typically pursue careers in various verticals leveraging information technology.

== Programs ==
The degree is offered under various names by:

- Singapore Management University as Master of IT in Business (MITB)
- Rutgers University as Master of Business & Science (MBS)
- James Cook University as Master of IT in Business Informatics (MITBI)
- RMIT as Master of Business Information Technology (MBIT)
- UNSW as Masters of Business & Technology (MBT)
- National University of Singapore as Masters of Science in Business Analytics (MSBA)

and by many other universities worldwide.

== Admissions ==
Many programs base their admission decisions in a very similar fashion to the MBA programs, on a combination of undergraduate grade point average, academic transcripts, entrance exam scores, a résumé containing significant work experience, essays, letters of recommendation, and personal interviews. Some schools are also interested in extracurricular activities, community service activities or volunteer work, and how the student can improve the school's diversity and contribute to the student body as a whole. The Graduate Management Admission Test (GMAT) is the most prominently used entrance exam for admissions into MITB programs. The Graduate Record Examination (GRE) is also accepted by almost all MITB programs to fulfill any entrance exam requirement they may have. Some schools do not weigh entrance exam scores as heavily as other criteria, and some programs do not require entrance exam scores for admission.
