= Open research =

Research made available to the public

A stop-motion video arguing that open research increases collaboration with the general public and their access to the information produced from the research as compared to traditional science

Open research is research that is openly accessible by others. Those who publish research in this way are often concerned with making research more transparent, more collaborative, more wide-reaching, and more efficient. Open research aims to make both research methods and the resulting data freely available, often via the internet, in order to support reproducibility and, potentially, massively distributed research collaboration. In this regard, it is related to both open source software and citizen science.

Especially for research that is scientific in nature, open research may be referred to as open science. However, the term can also implicate research done in fields as varied as the social sciences, the humanities, mathematics, engineering and medicine.

== Types of open projects ==
Important distinctions exist between different types of open projects.

Projects that provide open data but don't offer open collaboration are referred to as "open access" rather than open research. Providing open data is a necessary but not sufficient condition for open research, because although the data may be used by anyone, there is no requirement for subsequent research to take place openly. For example, though there have been many calls for more open collaborative research in drug discovery and the open deposition of large amounts of data, there are very few active, openly collaborative projects in this area.

Crowdsourcing projects that recruit large numbers of participants to carry out small tasks which are then assembled into a larger project outcome have delivered significant research outcomes, but these projects are distinct from those in which participants are able to influence the overall direction of the research, or in which participants are expected to have creative input into the science behind the project.

Most open research is conducted within existing research groups. Primary research data are posted which can be added to, or interpreted by, anyone who has the necessary expertise and who can therefore join the collaborative effort. Thus the "end product" of the project (which may still be subject to future expansion or modification) arises from many contributions across multiple research groups, rather than the effort of one group or individual. Open research is therefore distinct from open access in that the output of open research is prone to change with time.

Unlike open access, true open research must demonstrate live, online collaboration. Project websites that demonstrate this capability have started to become available.

== Copyright conventions ==
Issues with copyright are dealt with by using either standard copyright (where applicable), releasing the content into the Public domain or by releasing the content under licenses such as one of the Creative Commons licenses or one of the GNU General Public Licenses.

== Examples ==
In 2005, several examples arose in the area of the search for new/improved medical treatments of Neglected Diseases.

Science and engineering research to support the creation of open-source appropriate technology for sustainable development has long used open research principles. Open source research for sustainable development is now becoming formalized with open access for literature reviews, research methods, data, results and summaries for laypeople.

Wiki-based examples include: Appropedia, Wikiversity, Citizendium, Scholarpedia.

While first attempts towards opening research were primarily aimed at opening areas such as scientific data, methodologies, software and publications, now increasingly other artifacts of the scientific workflow are also tackled, such as scientific meta-data and funding ideas.

In 2013, open research became more mainstream with web based platforms such as figshare continuing to grow in terms of users and publicly available outputs.

The Transparency and Openness Promotion (TOP) Committee met in 2014 to address one key element of the incentive systems: journals' procedures and policies for publication. The committee consisted of disciplinary leaders, journal editors, funding agency representatives, and disciplinary experts largely from the social and behavioral sciences. By developing shared standards for open practices across journals, the committee said it hopes to translate scientific norms and values into concrete actions and change the current incentive structures to drive researchers' behavior toward more openness. The committee said it sought to produce guidelines that (a) focus on the commonalities across disciplines, and that (b) define what aspects of the research process should be made available to the community to evaluate, critique, reuse, and extend. The committee added that the guidelines aim to help improve journal policies in order to help transparency, openness, and reproducibility "become more evident in daily practice and ultimately improve the public trust in science, and science itself."

== See also ==
- Massive online open research
- Open science
- Open access
- Open education
- Open innovation
- Open notebook science
- Open peer review
- Science 2.0
- Science Commons
- Citizen science
