= Highly charged ion =

Ions in high charge states

Highly charged ions (HCI) are ions in very high charge states due to the loss of many or most of their bound electrons by energetic collisions or high-energy photon absorption. Examples are 13-fold ionized iron, Fe^{13+} or Fe XIV in spectroscopic notation, found in the Sun's corona, or naked uranium, U^{92+} (U XCIII in spectroscopic notation), which is bare of all bound electrons, and which requires very high energy for its production. HCI are found in stellar corona, in active galactic nuclei, in supernova remnants, and in accretion disks. Most of the visible matter found in the universe consists of highly charged ions. High temperature plasmas used for nuclear fusion energy research also contain HCI generated by the plasma-wall interaction (see Tokamak). In the laboratory, HCI are investigated by means of heavy ion particle accelerators and electron beam ion traps. They might have applications in improving atomic clocks, advances in quantum computing, and more accurate measurement of fundamental physical constants. Very highly charged ions are made in larger quantities in nuclear explosions. A temperature of around 350,000,000 K is representative of the conditions in thermonuclear weapons. At these temperatures, uranium and plutonium can achieve ionization states of 80 to 85. The last ionization energy for Pu and U (Pu XCV and U XCIII) is about 120 KeV. Because 120 KeV represents a temperature of 1.4 billion K, complete ionization of these atoms would normally be expected only in the most extreme conditions of thermonuclear weapons, if at all.
