= Constructive heuristic =

Type of heuristic method

A constructive heuristic is a type of heuristic method which starts with an empty solution and repeatedly extends the current solution until a complete solution is obtained. It differs from local search heuristics which start with a complete solution and then try to improve the current solution further via local moves. Examples of some famous problems that are solved using constructive heuristics are the flow shop scheduling, the vehicle routing problem and the open shop problem.

== See also ==
- Evolutionary algorithms
- Genetic algorithms
- Local search (optimization)
- Metaheuristics
