= Advanced Chemistry Development =

Software development company based in Toronto, Ontario, Canada

Advanced Chemistry Development Inc. (ACD/Labs)
- Type: Private
- Industry: Life Sciences, Chemistry Software
- Founded: 1994
- Headquarters: Toronto, ON, Canada, Toronto, Ontario, Canada
- Area served: Global
- Products: Integrated Chemical and Analytical Knowledge Management, Analytical Data Handling, Molecular Property Prediction & modelling, Computer Assisted Structure Elucidation, Chemical structure drawing, Chemical Nomenclature.
- Number of employees: 185 (2020)
- Website: www.acdlabs.com

Advanced Chemistry Development, Inc., (ACD/Labs) specializes in the design of software, with a focus on the R&D and chemistry of molecules ('small molecules'). They offer software for tasks including analytical data handling and knowledge management; in addition, molecular property modelling and property-based design are relevant areas of expertise in ACD Labs.

== Location ==
The company is headquartered in Toronto, Ontario, Canada with direct sales offices in the UK, Germany, France, Portugal, China, and Japan. The distribution channel extends throughout Europe to Australia, S. America, and Africa.

== History ==
ACD/Labs was founded in 1994 as a private company. The intention was to monetize the experience of an international team of scientists specializing in quantitative structure-property relationships, such as NMR spectra and various physico-chemical properties, such as pKa, logP, logD, boiling point, vapor pressure. Early on the development focused on predictors, chemical drawing and chemical naming. But by 1997 the scope expanded to also include chromatography, processing of optical and mass spectra and databasing.

Pharma Algorithms was established in 2001. Its team focused solely on quantitative property prediction, but employed wider array of methods and applied them not only to physico-chemical properties, but also to such areas as ADME, toxicity, reactivity.

In 2009 the companies merged under the name ACD/Labs. This allowed to combine ACD/Labs' expertise at spectra processing and some of its more tried-and-true prediction algorithms with Pharma Algorithm's expertise at building user-friendly GUI and predicting biochemical properties as well as their more flexible prediction engine. The merger marked a shift from "shrink-wrap software" oriented on individual research specialists toward integrating ACD/Labs products into an infrastructure of a client company.

On 10th Nov 2025, Revvity Inc announced that it has entered into a defnitive agreement to acquire ACD/Labs.

== See also ==
- International Union of Pure and Applied Chemistry
- Computer-Assisted Drug Design
- QSAR
- Structural Elucidation
- Scientific Data Management System
- Analytical Chemistry
- Instrumental chemistry
