= Structural chemistry =

Branch of chemistry which studies 3D structure of molecules

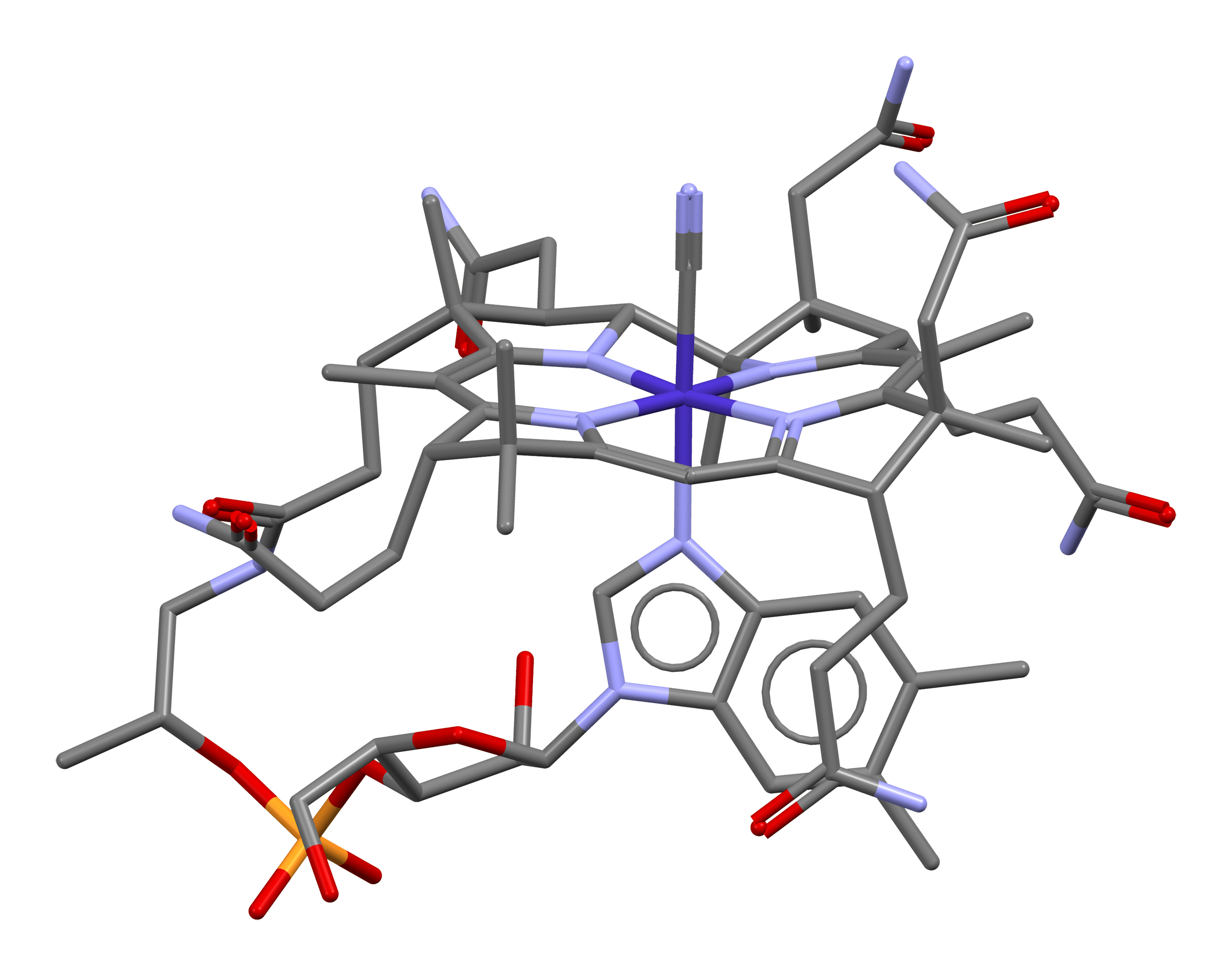
Structure of vitamin B12, recognized with the 1954 Nobel Prize in Chemistry in 1964.

Phosphorus pentoxide chemical structure in 2D

Structural chemistry is a part of chemistry and deals with the connectivity and shape of individual chemical species, which includes molecules, ions, and polymers. Structure is central to understanding the behavior of chemical species, so the topic is foundational. Structure is integrated into the major branches of chemistry, i.e. inorganic chemistry and organic chemistry. One indicator of the centrality of structural chemistry, many of the Nobel Prize in Chemistry have been awarded for structural insights or techniques important for determining structure.

A chemical structure of a molecule is a spatial arrangement of its atoms and their chemical bonds. Its determination includes a chemist's specifying the molecular geometry and, when feasible and necessary, the electronic structure of the target molecule or other solid. Molecular geometry refers to the spatial arrangement of atoms in a molecule and the chemical bonds that hold the atoms together and can be represented using structural formula and by molecular models; complete electronic structure descriptions include specifying the occupation of a molecule's molecular orbitals. Structure determination can be applied to a range of targets from very simple molecules (e.g., diatomic oxygen or nitrogen) to very complex ones (e.g., such as protein or DNA).

In chemistry, "structure" takes distinct meanings depending on the length scale and time scale. With respect to length scales, on a local level, structure refers to interatomic distances and angles. On a larger length, symmetry and periodicity are important descriptors.

Sodium chloride structure showing the packing of the Na^{+} and Cl^{-} ions and visualizing the polyhedra, octahedra in this case, defined by the placement of these ions.

== History ==
Theories of chemical structure were first developed by August Kekulé, Archibald Scott Couper, and Aleksandr Butlerov, among others, from about 1858. Kekulé proposed the earliest ideas about valency by suggesting the elements had a preferred number of chemical bonds. Couper developed the first chemical structure diagrams, ways of representing structure on paper. Butlerov was the first to use 'structure' in chemistry and to recognize that chemical compounds are not a random cluster of atoms and functional groups, but rather had a definite order defined by the valency of the elements composing the molecule.

In 1883 Alexander Crum Brown deduced the crystal structure of NaCl and built a model of it using knitting needles and wool balls. He also proposed a structure for ethanoic acid that matches modern models well before experimental structural analysis techniques were developed.

At the beginning of the 20th century only visible light spectroscopy gave direct structural information, but that changed rapidly. By 1915 William Henry Bragg and son William Lawrence Bragg received the Nobel prize for developing early forms of X-ray crystal structure analysis and in 1922, Francis Aston was awarded the prize for creating the first mass spectrometer. The discovery of quantum mechanics in the 1920 lead to a succession of fundamental physical studies that could be applied to determining chemical structure, including the Raman effect, Mossbauer spectroscopy, and nuclear magnetic resonance (NMR). Beginning in the 1970s, electronic detectors and computer-aided analysis techniques, dramatically increased structural data and reduced the time to create and analyze it. Especially notable for structural chemistry was the development of direct methods of X-ray crystallography by Herbert A. Hauptman and Jerome Karle, leading to the 1985 Nobel prize in Chemistry.

== Background ==
Concerning chemical structure, one has to distinguish between pure connectivity of the atoms within a molecule (chemical constitution), a description of a three-dimensional arrangement (molecular configuration, includes e.g. information on chirality) and the precise determination of bond lengths, angles, and torsion angles, i.e. a full representation of the (relative) atomic coordinates.

In determining structures of chemical compounds, one generally aims to obtain, first and minimally, the pattern and degree of bonding between all atoms in the molecule; when possible, one seeks the three-dimensional spatial coordinates of the atoms in the molecule (or other solid).

=== Structural elucidation ===
The methods by which one can determine the structure of a molecule is called structural elucidation. These methods include:

- concerning only connectivity of the atoms: spectroscopies such as nuclear magnetic resonance (proton and carbon-13 NMR), and various methods of mass spectrometry (to give overall molecular mass, as well as fragment masses). Techniques such as absorption spectroscopy and the vibrational spectroscopies, infrared, and Raman, provide, respectively, important supporting information about the numbers and adjacencies of multiple bonds, and about the types of functional groups (whose internal bonding gives vibrational signatures); further inferential studies that give insight into the contributing electronic structure of molecules include cyclic voltammetry and X-ray photoelectron spectroscopy.
- concerning precise metric three-dimensional information: can be obtained for gases by gas electron diffraction and microwave (rotational) spectroscopy (and other rotationally resolved spectroscopy) and for the crystalline solid state by X-ray crystallography or neutron diffraction. These techniques can produce three-dimensional models at atomic-scale resolution, typically to a precision of 0.001 Å for distances and 0.1° for angles (in unusual cases even better).

Additional sources of information are: When a molecule has an unpaired electron spin in a functional group of its structure, ENDOR and electron-spin resonance spectroscopes may also be performed. These latter techniques become all the more important when the molecules contain metal atoms, and when the crystals required by crystallography or the specific atom types that are required by NMR are unavailable to exploit in the structure determination. Finally, more specialized methods such as electron microscopy are also applicable in some cases.

== Inorganic vs organic structures ==
Broadly speaking, inorganic structural chemistry focuses on solids, especially crystalline solids as the vast majority of inorganic compounds are metals combined with non-metal elements forming solids. These structures are typically regular lattices of infinite extent in 2 or 3 dimensions. This allows the application of highly effective X-ray and neutron diffraction methods to determine chemical structure.

Organic structural chemistry deals with finite molecules which often exist as vapor, liquid, and solid states under different conditions. Simple finite molecules can be studied in the vapor phase with electron diffraction, but often spectroscopic techniques coupled with theory are required.

== Methodology ==
Many methods have been developed to determine chemical structure. The techniques vary with the nature of the sample: gas, liquid, and solid. One of the most important techniques is X-ray crystallography, which is used to analyze solids. Another dominant technique is NMR spectroscopy, which is routinely used in organic chemistry but is applicable to a variety of sample types.

In addition to static structures, structural chemistry also includes a focus on dynamics, such as fluxionality. In such cases, the time scale of the technique must be matched with the time scale of the dynamics. A classic example is dimethylformamide (DMF) where the dynamics are analyzed by dynamic NMR spectroscopy.

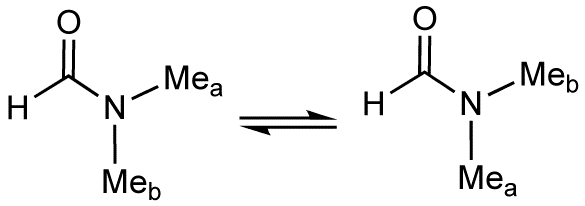

== TeX for chemical structures ==
Chemfig and tikz are package add-ons for LaTeX for chemical structures.

== See also ==
- ChemDraw - software for chemical structure diagrams
- Chemical graph generator
- Crystal structure
- Crystallographic database
- Pauli exclusion principle
- Structural formula
