= Computer-assisted structure elucidation =

Computer-assisted structure elucidation (or CASE) is the technique of using software to generate all possible molecular structures that are consistent with a particular set of spectroscopic data. The subject has been often reviewed. Available CASE software include LSD, SENECA, COCON, CMC-se, and Structure Elucidator.

== See also ==
- Computational chemistry
- Nuclear magnetic resonance spectroscopy
