= Open-notebook science =

Scientific research recorded in public

Open-notebook science is the practice of making the entire primary record of a research project publicly available online as it is recorded. This involves placing the personal, or laboratory, notebook of the researcher online along with all raw and processed data, and any associated material, as this material is generated. The approach may be summed up by the slogan 'no insider information'. It is the logical extreme of transparent approaches to research and explicitly includes the making available of failed, less significant, and otherwise unpublished experiments; so called 'dark data'. The practice of open notebook science, although not the norm in the academic community, has gained significant recent attention in the research and general media as part of a general trend towards more open approaches in research practice and publishing. Open notebook science can therefore be described as part of a wider open science movement that includes the advocacy and adoption of open access publication, open data, crowdsourcing data, and citizen science. It is inspired in part by the success of open-source software and draws on many of its ideas.

== History ==
The term "open-notebook science" was first used in 2006 in a blog post by Jean-Claude Bradley, an associate professor of chemistry at Drexel University at the time. Bradley described open-notebook science as follows:

... there is a URL to a laboratory notebook that is freely available and indexed on common search engines. It does not necessarily have to look like a paper notebook but it is essential that all of the information available to the researchers to make their conclusions is equally available to the rest of the world

— Jean-Claude Bradley

== Practitioners ==
=== Active ===
==== Experimental (alphabetical by last name) ====
- Aled Edwards & colleagues, University of Toronto.
- Rachel Harding, post-doctoral fellow with University of Toronto's (SGC) Structural Genomics Consortium.
  - blog at http://labscribbles.com/
  - Twitter @labscribbles
  - Zenodo https://zenodo.org/search?f=author&p=Rachel%20Harding&ln=en

"A team of groundbreaking scientists at SGC are now sharing their lab notebooks online".

- Nickolas J. LaSorte, Postdoctoral Fellow at the FDA in the area of Wireless Coexistence.
- Tamara Maiuri
  - blog at https://raytruantlab.wordpress.com/
  - Twitter @tam_maiuri
  - Zenodo https://zenodo.org/search?page=1&size=20&q=maiuri
- Peter Murray-Rust, Cambridge, UK.
- Anthony Salvagno, Ph.D., Director of Education of #SciFund Challenge.
- Matthew H. Todd, Open Source Malaria, University College London (Todd Group).
- Open Notebook Science Challenge
- The Digital Botanical Gardens Initiative (DBGI) observable at http://www.dbgi.org/dendron-dbgi/

==== Theoretical ====
- Tobias J. Osborne
- Carl Boettiger, Theory and computational modeling in ecology and evolution.
- Dror Bar-Natan
- Andrés G. Saravia, physics Ph.D. student at Cinvestav-Mérida.
- Daniel Himmelstein, who led Project Rephetio — a drug repurposing study that used GitHub and Thinklab for realtime open notebook science and collaboration.

=== Archived (alphabetical by last name) ===
- Brigette Black), physics Ph.D. student in Koch lab at the University of New Mexico.
- Jean-Claude Bradley
- Jeremiah Faith
- Nadiezda Fernandez-Oropeza, Biomedical Engineering Ph.D. student in Koch lab at the University of New Mexico.
- Mike Lawrence
- Linh Le, undergraduate physics major and alumnus of Koch lab at the University of New Mexico.
- Andy Maloney, postdoctoral researcher in Smyth lab at University of Texas. Ph.D. in Koch lab at the University of New Mexico (2011)
- Cameron Neylon
- Alejandro Tamayo
- Influenza Origins and Evolution

=== Recurrent (educational) ===
- Junior Physics Lab (307L) at University of New Mexico

=== Partially open/pseudo-open notebooks ===
These are initiatives more open than traditional laboratory notebooks but lacking a key component for full Open Notebook Science. Usually either the notebook is only partially shared or shared with significant delay.

- The Open Notebook Science Network is a WordPress blog network designed to be used to create and maintain individual/lab notebooks. As of January 2018, there are currently 126 active members of this group.
- Protocolpedia allows sharing and storage of lab protocols.
- Sci-Mate allows users to define access permissions, but can be used as an open notebook tool.
- Vinod Scaria
- OpenWetWare (hosts many laboratories and allows for selective sharing of information related to each research group)
- Caleb Morse
- Gus Rosania
- Antony Garrett Lisi
- Rosie Redfield, microbiologist at the University of British Columbia; all results discussed but raw experimental notebook is not exposed.
- Martin Johnson, marine chemist at the University of East Anglia.
- Greg Lang, post doc in David Botstein's lab at Princeton University. - shared on approximately a weekly basis

== Benefits ==
A public laboratory notebook makes it convenient to cite the exact instances of experiments used to support arguments in articles. For example, in a paper on the optimization of a Ugi reaction, three different batches of product are used in the characterization and each spectrum references the specific experiment where each batch was used: EXP099, EXP203 and EXP206. This work was subsequently published in the Journal of Visualized Experiments, demonstrating that the integrity data provenance can be maintained from lab notebook to final publication in a peer-reviewed journal.

Without further qualifications, Open Notebook Science implies that the research is being reported on an ongoing basis without unreasonable delay or filter. This enables others to understand exactly how research actually happens within a field or a specific research group. Such information could be of value to collaborators, prospective students or future employers. Providing access to selective notebook pages or inserting an embargo period would be inconsistent with the meaning of the term "Open" in this context. Unless error corrections, failed experiments and ambiguous results are reported, it will not be possible for an outside observer to understand exactly how science is being done. Terms such as Pseudo or Partial have been used as qualifiers for the sharing of laboratory notebook information in a selective way or with a significant delay.

== Drawbacks ==
The arguments against adopting open notebook science fall mainly into three categories which have differing importance in different fields of science. The primary concern, expressed particularly by biological and medical scientists is that of 'data theft' or 'being scooped'. While the degree to which research groups steal or adapt the results of others remains a subject of debate it is certainly the case that the fear of not being first to publish drives much behavior, particularly in some fields. This is related to the focus in these fields on the published peer-reviewed paper as being the main metric of career success.

The second argument advanced against open notebook science is that it constitutes prior publication, thus making it impossible to patent and difficult to publish the results in the traditional peer reviewed literature. With respect to patents, publication on the web is clearly classified as disclosure. Therefore, while there may be arguments over the value of patents, and approaches that get around this problem, it is clear that open notebook science is not appropriate for research for which patent protection is an expected and desired outcome. With respect to publication in the peer-reviewed literature the case is less clear cut. Most publishers of scientific journals accept material that has previously been presented at a conference or in the form of a preprint. Those publishers that accept material that has been previously published in these forms have generally indicated informally that web publication of data, including open notebook science, falls into this category. Open notebook projects have been successfully published in high impact factor peer-reviewed journals but this has not been tested with a wide range of publishers. It is to be expected that those publishers that explicitly exclude these forms of pre-publication will not accept material previously disclosed in an open notebook.

A third argument advanced against open notebook science is that it vitiates independence of competing research and hence may result in lack of all important independent verification of results. This is not the same as data-scooping, but the much more subtle possibility of allowing data that is co-evolving to influence each other. In traditional science large experimental collaborations often establish fire-wall rules preventing communication between members of competing collaborations to prevent not just data leakage but also influencing the methodology by which data is analyzed.

The final argument relates to the problem of the 'data deluge'. If the current volume of the peer-reviewed literature is too large for any one person to manage, then how can anyone be expected to cope with the huge quantity of non–peer-reviewed material that could potentially be available, especially when some, perhaps most, would be of poor quality? A related argument is that 'my notebook is too specific' for it to be of interest to anyone else. The question of how to discover high quality and relevant material is a related issue. The issue of curation and validating data and methodological quality is a serious issue and one that arguably has relevance beyond open notebook science but is a particular challenge here.

== Funding and sponsorship ==
The Open Notebook Science Challenge, now directed towards reporting solubility measurements in non-aqueous solvent, has received sponsorship from Submeta, Nature and Sigma-Aldrich. The first of ten winners of the contest for December 2008 was Jenny Hale.

== Logos ==
Logos can be used on notebooks to indicate the conditions of sharing. Fully open notebooks are marked as "all content" and "immediate" access. Partially open notebooks can be marked as either "selected content" and/or "delayed".

== See also ==
- Open access (publishing)
- Open data
- Open research
- Open content
- Open science
- Open source
