= Electron beam ion trap =

Schematics of an electron beam ion trap. Red: electron source filament, blue: electron beam, black: electrodes, green: magnet. The thin line represents the electric potential along the axis.

Electron beam ion trap (EBIT) is an electromagnetic bottle that produces and confines highly charged ions. An EBIT uses an electron beam focused with a powerful magnetic field to ionize atoms to high charge states by successive electron impact.

It was invented by M. Levine and R. Marrs at LLNL and LBNL.

== Operation ==
The positive ions produced in the region where the atoms intercept the electron beam are tightly confined in their motion by the strong attraction exerted by the negative charge of the electron beam. Therefore, they orbit around the electron beam, crossing it frequently and giving rise to further collisions and ionization. To restrict the ion motion along the direction of the electron beam axis, trapping electrodes carrying positive voltages with respect to a central electrode are used.

The resulting ion trap can hold ions for many seconds and minutes, and conditions for reaching the highest charge states, up to bare uranium (U^{92+}) can be achieved in this way.

The strong charge needed for radial confinement of the ions requires large electron beam currents of tens up to hundreds of milliampere. At the same time, high voltages (up to 200 kilovolts) are used for accelerating the electrons in order to achieve high charge states of the ions.

To avoid charge reduction of ions by collisions with neutral atoms from which they can capture electrons, the vacuum in the apparatus is usually maintained at UHV levels, with typical pressure values of only 10^{−12} torr, (~10^{−10} pascal).

== Applications ==
EBITs are used to investigate the fundamental properties of highly charged ions e. g. by photon spectroscopy in particular in the context of relativistic atomic structure theory and quantum electrodynamics (QED). Their suitability to prepare and reproduce in a microscopic volume the conditions of high temperature astrophysical plasmas and magnetic confinement fusion plasmas make them very appropriate research tools. Other fields include the study of their interactions with surfaces and possible applications to microlithography.
