= Carter =

Carter(s), or Carter's, Tha Carter, or The Carter(s), may refer to:

== Geography ==
=== United States ===
- Carter, Arkansas, an unincorporated community
- Carter, Mississippi, an unincorporated community
- Carter, Montana, a census-designated place
- Carter, South Dakota, an unincorporated community
- Carter, Forest County, Wisconsin, an unincorporated community
- Carter, Iron County, Wisconsin, an unincorporated community
- Carter, Wyoming, a census-designated place
- Carters, Georgia, an unincorporated community
- Carter County (disambiguation)
- Carter Township (disambiguation)

=== Canada ===
- Carter Islands, Nunavut, Canada

== People and fictional characters ==
- Carter (name), a surname and a given name, including a list of people and fictional characters
- Carter, someone whose occupation is transporting goods by cart or wagon

== Arts and entertainment ==
=== Music ===
==== Groups ====
- Carter the Unstoppable Sex Machine, an English indie punk band also known as Carter USM
- The Carters, the American duo behind the album Everything Is Love (2018)

==== Lil Wayne albums ====
- Tha Carter
- Tha Carter II
- Tha Carter III
- Tha Carter IV
- Tha Carter V
- Tha Carter VI

=== Film and television ===
- Carter (TV series), a 2018 Canadian television crime drama
- The Carter, a 2019 American documentary film about Dwayne Carter
- Carter (film), a 2022 South Korean action adventure film

== Brands and enterprises ==
- Carter Machinery, a Virginia-based Caterpillar distributor and manufacturer of engine lubricants
- Carter's, a clothing manufacturer of primarily baby and children's apparel
- Carter's Foods, a defunct supermarket chain
- Carters Coach Services, a bus operating company in Suffolk, England

== Other uses ==
- Carter (supercomputer), Purdue University

== See also ==
- Agent Carter (disambiguation)
- Jimmy Carter, 39th president of the United States from 1977 to 1981
- Carter Center, American nonprofit organization
- Carter Road Promenade, former name of Sangeet Samrat Naushad Ali Marg in Mumbai, India
