= Clarence L. "Ben" Coates =

American computer scientist (1923–2000)

Clarence Leroy “Ben” Coates (November 5, 1923 – October 25, 2000) was an American computer scientist and engineer known for his work on waveform recognition devices, circuit gates and accumulators.

== Early life ==
He was born November 5, 1923, in Hastings, Nebraska, the son of Clarence Leroy Coates and Mildred Creighton. He earned his bachelor's degree in electrical engineering from the University of Kansas in 1944. After completing his bachelor's degree, he served in the U.S. Navy during World War II from 1944–1946. He then returned to the University of Kansas to obtain his master's degree in electrical engineering in 1948.

== Professional career ==
He received his doctorate from the University of Illinois in 1953. He then taught electrical engineering and computer science at the universities of Illinois, Kansas and UT Austin and at Rensselaer Polytechnic Institute before going to Purdue. He directed the Electronics Research Center and supervised the engineering computer facilities at Texas and started a graduate program in information sciences. At Illinois, he directed the Coordinated Sciences Laboratory, an interdisciplinary lab focused on computers, information processing and electronics.

He was a research scientist at the General Electric Research Laboratory in New York City from 1956–63 and held five patents involving waveform recognition devices, circuit gates and accumulators on computer chips. He was named a fellow of the Institute of Electrical and Electronics Engineers (IEEE) in 1974 and the American Association for the Advancement of Science in 1980.

Coates joined the faculty at Purdue University in 1973 as head of the School of Electrical Engineering (now Electrical and Computer Engineering) where, for the next decade, he emphasized computer education and the development of computing facilities. He was a driving force behind the high performance computing and networking plan that led to the creation of the Engineering Computer Network (ECN) serving all of Purdue's engineering schools. He also initiated a degree program in computer engineering at Purdue. He returned to teaching in the computer field full-time in 1983 before retiring in 1988.

Ben Coates died in Osprey, Florida on October 25, 2000, at age 76. In 2009, Purdue named the Coates supercomputing cluster, after him, continuing a practice of naming the machines for prominent figures in the history of computing at the university, which began with Purdue's Steele cluster. Like Steele, Rossman and Carter, Coates is part of the DiaGrid distributed computing network. Coates will be operated by Information Technology at Purdue (ITaP), the university's central information technology organization, and the Rosen Center for Advanced Computing, ITaP's research and discovery arm.
