= Science gateway =

Science gateways provide access to advanced resources for science and engineering researchers, educators, and students. Through streamlined, online, user-friendly interfaces, gateways combine a variety of cyberinfrastructure (CI) components in support of a community-specific set of tools, applications, and data collections.: In general, these specialized, shared resources are integrated as a Web portal, mobile app, or a suite of applications. Through science gateways, broad communities of researchers can access diverse resources which can save both time and money for themselves and their institutions. As listed below, functions and resources offered by science gateways include shared equipment and instruments, computational services, advanced software applications, collaboration capabilities, data repositories, and networks.

shared equipment and instruments

- telescopes
- sensors
- seismic shake tables

computational services

- supercomputers
- cloud computing
- clusters

advanced software applications

- workflows
- analysis tools
- simulation tools
- modeling tools
- visualization tools

collaboration capabilities

- between researchers or educators
- citizen science

data repositories

- sky surveys
- cloud storage

networks

- high-speed
- high-bandwidth

== History ==
For decades, science gateways existed in various forms that would not have been called science gateways at the time, but in the last decade, more projects have coalesced around the term. For example, the Protein Data Bank: started in 1971 and continues to provide a crucial service for its community.

Science gateways are often labeled with other names, depending on the community or region of the world. Alternative names include

- Portal
- Virtual research environment
- Virtual laboratory
- Hub
- e-Science
- e-Research
- Digital interface
- Digital presence
- Online web presence
- Citizen Science website or project
- Collaboratory
- Virtual Community Platform

Some of the earliest gateways to provide simplified interfaces to high-performance grid computing used the US-based TeraGrid computing infrastructure, funded by the National Science Foundation. TeraGrid (now continued under the auspices of the Extreme Science and Engineering Discovery Environment, or XSEDE) brought together a diverse community of software developers, who were otherwise isolated from each other by disparate fields of application. In Australia, e-Research body NeCTAR provides similar resources and support for gateways. With the growth of this community in the US, Europe, and Australasia, several workshop series helped gateway creators and users coalesce around the concept and form a community of practice: Gateway Computing Environments (US, started in 2005), International Workshop on Science Gateways (Europe, started in 2009), and International Workshop on Science Gateways - Australia (started in 2016).

Additionally, middleware to support gateways have proliferated, including:

- Apache Airavata
- CitSci.org
- Tapis (formerly CyVerse/iPlant Collaborative)
- Galaxy Project
- Globus Toolkit
- HUBzero
- Zooniverse

As some of the earliest gateways (and other digital resources) reached the end of their first funding cycle, users began to see some gateways shutting down due to lack of funding or insufficient progress building a sustainable tool; this prompted further investigation into the keys to sustainability for such projects. Recognizing a need for software reuse and community exchange, the US National Science Foundation funded in 2016 the Science Gateways Community Institute, which provides subsidized services and resources to the developers and users of science gateways. On an international level, the International Coalition on Science Gateways brings together organizations from multiple countries and continents to share best practices and future directions in the field.

== See also ==
- Virtual Research Environment
- Grid Computing
- Cloud Computing
- Web Portal
- Citizen Science
