= Carter (supercomputer) =

Supercomputer installed at Purdue University in 2011

Carter is a supercomputer installed at Purdue University in November 2011 in a partnership with Intel. The high-performance computing cluster is operated by Information Technology at Purdue (ITaP), the university's central information technology organization. ITaP also operates clusters named Steele built in 2007, Coates built in 2009, Rossmann built in 2010, and Hansen built in the summer of 2011. Carter was the fastest campus supercomputer in the U.S. outside a national center when built. It was one of the first clusters to employ Intel's second generation Xeon E5 "Sandy Bridge" processor and ranked 54th on the November 2011 TOP500 list, making it Purdue's first Top 100-ranked research computing system.

== Hardware ==
The Carter cluster consists of HP Proliant compute nodes with two 8-core Intel Xeon-E5 processors (16 cores per node), either 32 gigabytes or 64 GB of memory, and a 500 GB system disk. NVIDIA Tesla GPU-accelerated nodes also are available. All nodes have 56 Gbit/s FDR Infiniband connections from Mellanox. Carter was the first cluster to employ this generation of Mellanox interconnects.

== Software ==
Carter nodes run Red Hat Enterprise Linux 6 (RHEL6) and Carter uses Moab Workload Manager 6 and TORQUE Resource Manager 3 as the portable batch system (PBS) for resource and job management. The cluster also has compilers and scientific programming libraries installed.

== Funding ==
The Carter supercomputer and Purdue's other clusters are part of the Purdue Community Cluster Program, a partnership between ITaP and Purdue faculty. In Purdue's program, a "community" cluster is funded by hardware money from grants, faculty startup packages, institutional funds and other sources. ITaP's Rosen Center for Advanced Computing administers the community clusters and provides user support. Each faculty partner always has ready access to the capacity he or she purchases and potentially to more computing power when the nodes of other investors are idle. Unused, or opportunistic, cycles from Carter are made available to the National Science Foundation's Extreme Science and Engineering Discovery Environment (XSEDE) system and the Open Science Grid.

== Users ==
The Purdue departments and schools by which Carter and Purdue's clusters are used vary broadly, including Aeronautics and Astronautics, Agriculture, Agronomy, Biology, Chemical Engineering, Chemistry, Civil Engineering, Communications, Computer and Information Technology, Computer Science, Earth, Atmospheric and Planetary Sciences, Electrical Engineering, Electrical and Computer Engineering, Electrical and Computer Engineering Technology, Industrial Engineering, Materials Engineering, Mathematics, Mechanical Engineering, Medicinal Chemistry and Molecular Pharmacology, Physics, the Purdue Terrestrial Observatory and Statistics, among others.

== DiaGrid ==
Unused, or opportunistic, cycles from Carter are made available to XSEDE and the Open Science Grid using Condor software. Coates is part of Purdue's distributed computing Condor flock, which is the largest publicly disclosed distributed computing system in the world and the center of DiaGrid, a nearly 43,000-processor Condor-powered distributed computing network for research involving Purdue and partners at nine other campuses.

== Naming ==
The Carter cluster is named for Dennis Lee Carter, the retired vice president for marketing of Intel, who received his master's degree in electrical engineering from Purdue in 1974. He is credited with creating and implementing the internationally recognized “Intel Inside” campaign, spurred by what Carter says was his recognition at the dawn of the PC age that Intel needed to begin talking to the general public, not just to the PC company design engineers who had been its traditional focus. The campaign created the first broad brand awareness of a microprocessor as a key ingredient in a personal computer and made Intel’s logo a feature on the outside of most of the world’s PCs, while its five-note jingle became one of the most recognizable tunes on television. Carter also worked with Intel President Andy Grove to create the iconic Pentium brand name. The Carter cluster continues ITaP's practice of naming new supercomputers after notable figures in Purdue's computing history.
