= National Institute for Environmental eScience =

English research institute

The National Institute for Environmental eScience (NIEeS) was a collaboration between Natural Environment Research Council (NERC) and the University of Cambridge. It was established in July 2002 and in addition to its main role of promoting and supporting the use of e-Science and grid technologies within the field of environmental research, its purpose was to:

- Train scientists in environmental eScience
- Demonstrate environmental eScience
- Help develop the environmental eScience community
- Aid collaborations between scientists and industries

It was intended as a national resource to be "owned by the whole community". The website remains available; however, the contract for the project ended in August 2008.
