= VRE =

VRE may refer to:

== Science and technology ==
- Vancomycin-resistant Enterococcus, a bacterial strain
- Variable renewable energy, an electricity generation class
- Virtual research environment, a class of online collaboration platform

== Transport ==
- Virginia Railway Express, United States (commenced 1992)
- Volare Airlines, Italy (1998–2015; ICAO:VRE)
