= Carterville =

Carterville may refer to:

== Places ==
United States

- Carterville, Illinois
- Carterville High School, in Illinois
- Carterville Precinct, Williamson County, Illinois
- Carterville, Missouri
- Carterville Formation, geologic formation in Missouri
- Carterville, Montana

== See also ==
- Carter (disambiguation)
- Carterton (disambiguation)
- Cartersville
- Cartersburg
