= Bigben (computer) =

The Bigben supercomputer was a Cray XT3 MPP system with 2068 nodes located at Pittsburgh Supercomputing Center. It was decommissioned on March 31, 2010. Bigben was a part of the TeraGrid.

== System architecture ==
BigBen was a Cray XT3 MPP system with 2,068 compute nodes linked by a custom-designed interconnect. Twenty-two dedicated IO processors were also connected to this network. Each compute node had two 2.6 GHz AMD Opteron processors. Each compute processor had its own cache, but the two processors on a node shared 2 GB of memory and the network connection.

== Operating system ==
Bigben ran Catamount, a subset of Unix. On Bigben's front-end processors, SUSE Linux was used.

== File system ==
Bigben had two file systems comprising together over 200 TB of storage space.

== Compilers ==
Bigben had Portland Group, GNU, and UPC compilers installed.

== See also ==
- TeraGrid
- National Science Foundation
- Pittsburgh Supercomputing Center
