= Cartersville (disambiguation) =

Cartersville is a city in Georgia, US.

Cartersville may also refer to:

== Places in the United States ==
- Cartersville, Cumberland County, Virginia
- Cartersville, Pittsylvania County, Virginia
- Cartersville, Iowa
- Cartersville, South Carolina

== See also ==
- Carterville (disambiguation)
