= D4Science =

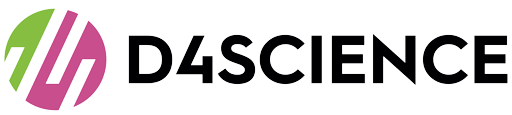
- Nickname: D4Science
- Headquarters: Istituto di Scienza e Tecnologie dell'Informazione, Pisa, Italy
- Products: Virtual Research Environments, Science Gateways, cloud computing, e-infrastructure
- Website: www.d4science.org

D4Science is an organisation operating a Data Infrastructure offering services by community-driven virtual research environments. In particular, it supports communities of practice willing to implement open science practices. The infrastructure follows the system of systems approach, where the constituent systems (Service providers) offer "resources" (namely services and by them data, computing, storage) assembled together to implement the overall set of D4Science services. In particular, D4Science aggregates "domain agnostic" service providers as well as community-specific ones to build a unifying space where the aggregated resources can be exploited via Virtual research Environments and their services.

This organization is hosted by the Istituto di Scienza e Tecnologie dell'Informazione of National Research Council (Italy).

At the earth of this infrastructure there is an Open Source Software named gCube system.

== Services ==
D4Science offers:

- Virtual Research Environment as a Service providing any community of practice with a dedicated working environment supporting any knowledge production process in a collaborative way, in fact every VRE enables computer-supported cooperative work by design. D4Science-based VREs are web-based, community-oriented, collaborative, user-friendly, open-science-enabler working environments for scientists and practitioners willing to work together to perform a set of (research) task. From the end-user perspective, each VRE manifests in a unifying web application (and a set of application programming interfaces (APIs)): (a) comprising several applications organised in specific menu items and (b) running in a plain web browser. Every application is providing VRE users with facilities implemented by relying on one or more services provisioned by diverse providers. Among the basic services every VRE is equipped with there are
  - a Social Networking area enabling collaborative and open discussions on any topic and disseminating information of interest for the community, for example, the availability of a research outcome;
  - a Workspace for storing, organizing and sharing any version of a research artifact, including dataset and model implementation;
  - a User Management dashboard for managing membership and roles;
  - a Catalogue Service recording the assets worth being published thus to make it possible for others to be informed and make use of these assets.
- Science Gateway as a Service providing a community of practice with a dedicated science gateway hosting a selected set of virtual research environments.
- Data Analytics at scale for data analytics including:
  - a proprietary data analytics platform (DataMiner) to execute analytics tasks either by relying on methods provided by the user or by others. It is endowed with importing and sharing facilities for analytics methods implemented in heterogeneous forms including R, Java, Python, and KNIME. The platform enacts tasks execution by a distributed and hybrid computing infrastructure. Moreover, one of the worth highlighting feature of this platform is its open science-friendliness. All the analytics methods integrated in it are exposed by a standard protocol (the OGC WPS protocol) clients can use to get informed on available methods as well as to start processes, monitor their execution and access results. Every analytics task performed by the platform automatically produces a provenance record catering for the reproducibility of the task;
  - an RStudio-based development environment for R enabling to perform statistical computing tasks in the cloud. This RStudio environment is (i) preconfigured with libraries and packages to ease the execution of common data analytics tasks, and (ii) provides seamless access to the VRE Workspace enabling sharing of resources with other members of the same working environment.
  - a Jupyter-based notebook environment for developing and executing interactive computing by JupyterLab instances. Each JupyterLab is (i) preconfigured with libraries and packages to ease the execution of common data analytics tasks, and (ii) provides access to the VRE Workspace enabling sharing of resources with other members of the same working environment.

The D4Science Infrastructure is serving thousands of users (more than 20,000 registered users in June 2023) by 178 active VREs offered via 20 Science gateways.

== History ==
The D4Science initiative has been developed and supported by several European-funded projects.

DILIGENT (2004-2007) in the Sixth Framework Programme for Research and Technological Development was the forerunner where a testbed infrastructure built by integrating digital library and grid computing technologies and resources was conceived and developed to serve the needs of communities of practice involved in knowledge development.

In the context of the Seventh Framework Programme for research, technological development and demonstration the development of the D4Science initiative. In this period the infrastructure was established and developed to serve communities of practices from domains ranging from Earth Science to Marine Science with worldwide scope

In the context of the H2020 research and innovation programme the maturity level of the D4Science infrastructure was enough to allow a set of communities of practice to benefit from it and its services and further contribute to its development. The services offered were developed with the stated goal of supporting open science practices.

The operation and improvement of the D4Science infrastructure facilities are still ongoing while its exploitation is progressively growing.

Supported communities and cases range from Agri-food to Social Data Science , Earth Science and Marine Science.

== See also ==
- European Open Science Cloud the European initiative for creating an environment for hosting and processing research data and promote open science.
- European Grid Infrastructure the e-Infrastructure set up to provide advanced computing and data analytics services for research and innovation.
- OpenAIRE the European initiative to shift scholarly communication towards openness and transparency and to facilitate innovative ways to communicate and monitor research.
