= Community ownership =

Representative ownership mechanism

Community ownership is a broad term that refers to shared ownership and decision making over local assets, resources, or services, typically for the purpose of ensuring economic, cultural, and social benefits for its users. The forms of community ownership and concepts about what constitutes “ownership” are diverse and depend greatly on context. However, generally in cases of community ownership, the word “community” generally refers to people on the ground, rather than governments or the ruling class. Contemporary community ownership has developed as an alternative to the gradual enclosure and privatization of land and resources, and renewed to address emerging issues such as digitization.

== Origins of community ownership ==
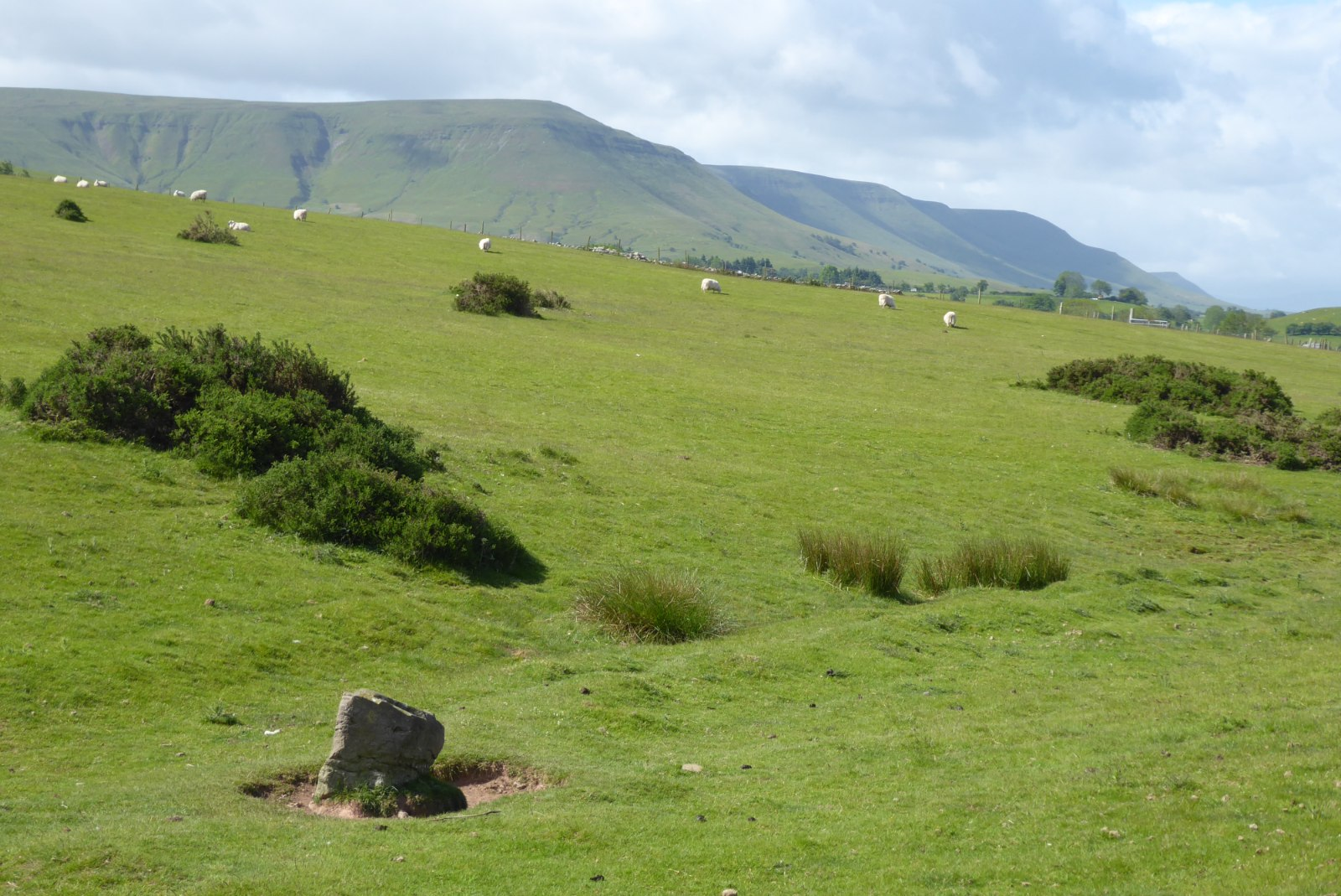
Common grazing land below the Black Mountains which can be seen in the background. Copyright Philip Halling and licensed for reuse under this Creative Commons License.

The stewardship of collectively held resources by communities for shared benefit and survival dates back to early human settlements around agricultural or spiritual sites. In these early days the idea of personal “ownership” extended to personal belongings, such as tools, whereas land was treated as a communal resource and land-based activities (such as food production) were directed towards collective benefit. Concepts of land ownership, control, and conquest spread through with the Roman Empire, and were increasingly replicated by a growing ruling class, monarchs and religious institutions. Since then, globally the enclosure and privatization of land has become common, with a marked acceleration of privatization beginning during the Industrial Revolution and the rise of capitalism.

In response, in recent centuries community ownership has become a means to protect and secure local control over community resources, and resist land and resource enclosure privatization, growing inequality, poverty, and wealth and ownership gaps. Regions around the world have particular histories and relationships with forms of community ownership and governance which greatly influence the nature of community ownership projects. For example, community ownership initiatives in the United States may draw on long histories of Indigenous traditional economics and ways of being, Black cooperativism, community organizing and other forms of solidarity economics.

== Forms of community ownership ==
Community ownership has many diverse forms, which are strongly influenced by both the initiative's objectives and its cultural and regulatory context. For example, in the United States, community ownership efforts may seek to respond to one or more of the following in the design of the project: 1) the theft and subsequent development of Indigenous land; 2) post-industrialization displacement due to gentrification, industrial and urban development, and environmental disasters such as climate change and pollution; 3) the theft of land held by African American families and farmers as well as their subsequent exclusion from ownership opportunities due to racial discrimination (such as redlining) and predatory lending practices, including price discrimination; and 4) the increasing cost and inaccessibility of land for housing, agriculture, and space for shared community resources such as parks, gardens, and gathering areas.

Woodin et al. (2010) propose the following as a broader categorization of some of the most common forms that community ownership can take.

- Common and customary ownership. This form is also sometimes termed as a commons, referring to community resources governed through defined stewardship customs and agreements. This form includes early approaches to communal stewardship that was directly connected to livelihoods. These instances of common or customary ownership may lack formal or legal owners, but still secure open access to a collectively held resource. Some examples include common land, forests, and water sources.
- Cooperatives and mutuals. These are entities (often legally recognized) that bring together an association of members to meet community needs through a democratically controlled enterprise or entity. Key characteristics of cooperatives are that they are linked by a set of principles, and that they are democratically governed and jointly owned by their users. Different types of cooperatives may have different names depending on their context and country, but common names and types include producer cooperatives, savings cooperatives, worker cooperatives, social cooperatives, consumer cooperatives, housing cooperatives, and multi-stakeholder cooperatives. Examples of cooperatives include Mondragon Corporation, Cooperative Home Care Associates, Organic Valley, COOPELESCA, and many more.
- Community ownership. This is a broad category encompassing many forms of local efforts to bring resources or assets under community control in order to meet community needs. Components of community ownership may include legal ownership, varying forms of governance including voting, community decision power, and financial benefits (such as locally accruing revenues). Examples include the community ownership of land, such as community land trusts and real estate investment trusts, as well as the shared ownership of other assets, such as community equity endowments and democratic investment funds. Examples of this include the Boston Ujima Project Inc. and the Sogorea Te' Land Trust. Community ownership can also be extended to community based services, such as the provision of decentralized renewable energy such as LUMAMA, a community-based and owned solar mini-grid in Tanzania.

== Emerging issues in community ownership ==
With increased digitization, community ownership of intangible assets, such as data, information, knowledge, and culture, has also taken on new relevance. Within the digital realm, market concentration, digital exclusion, insufficient data governance and erosion of self-determination are some concerns that forms of digital community ownership seeks to address.

Forms of community ownership described above, such as a commons or a cooperative, can also be used to secure community control of digital assets. Some examples of this include:

- Digital commons, which, much like the commons approach described above, seek to respond to the increasing enclosure and commodification of knowledge by securing the lasting availability and democratic control of information, culture, and knowledge that is created and/or maintained online. The enclosure or commodification of digital knowledge is implemented and regulated in many ways, including the expansion of the application of copyright laws, and subscription-based or paid-per-unit access to digital goods such as academic research and software licenses. Examples of digital commons that aim to reverse this enclosure include Wikipedia, open source software, and Creative Commons licenses.
- Data cooperatives, which are a form of cooperative that creates democratic and collective control over “the design, collection, processing, pooling, management, analysis, and/or sharing of data”. A significant emerging area of study is the use of healthcare data cooperatives, which have the potential to reduce entry and miscommunication errors in medical settings and increase the accessibility and usefulness of patients’ medical data for the patients themselves by digitizing access to information in a shared platform, and making the use of data visualization and analysis tools available to patients to understand trends and patterns in their medical data over time. Additional examples include the Chesapeake Monitoring Cooperative and MIDATA.
- Platform cooperatives, which are digital platforms (i.e. online applications or websites) that provide and/or sell goods and services and are owned and governed by its users, workers, or other stakeholders. In general, digital platforms offer an opportunity to access a strong competitive advantage for the businesses and organizations that have implemented them, particularly because of the widened access to customers and customer data that they provide. The application of the cooperative model in the context of digital platforms can help link the financial benefit and the service quality generated by a digital platform directly to the needs of its users, customers, or employees. For example, Smart.coop is a single, user-owned platform designed to connect independent creative workers in Europe to benefits and protections that are typically only available to salaried workers, such as legal council, health insurance, and unemployment benefits. Additional examples include Stocksy and The Drivers Cooperative.

== See also ==
- Commons
- Community wealth building
- Community wind energy
- Cooperative
- List of fan-owned sports teams
- Reclaim the Streets

== External links and further reading ==
- Bryden, J and Geisler, C (2007) Land Reform and Community - a ‘new wave’ land reform? Land Use Policy
- Community Owned Business This article by the American Independent Business Alliance explains the distinctions between community-owned and cooperative businesses and indexes many examples of community-owned enterprises in different business sectors.
- "Local Stock Exchanges and National Stimulus" by Michael H. Shuman, originally published in the Federal Reserve Bank of San Francisco's Community Development Investment Review Volume 5, Issue 2, 2009
- "Community Development Investment Review" Volume 5, Issue 2, 2009, foreword by David Erickson, Federal Reserve Bank of San Francisco. Full review
- Could “Small Is Beautiful” Replace “Too Big to Fail?” Don Shaffer, RSF Social Finance
