= Stefania Gnesi =

Italian software engineer

Stefania Gnesi (born 1954) is an Italian software engineer whose work focuses on formal methods, and the use of natural language and natural language processing in requirements analysis. She is a director of research at the Istituto di Scienza e Tecnologie dell'Informazione of the Italian National Research Council (CNR), where she heads the Formal Methods and Tools group.

== Education and career ==
Gnesi was born in 1954 in Livorno, and graduated summa cum laude in 1978 from the University of Pisa, with a degree in computer science.

She began her work at the CNR working with Norma Lijtmaer at the Istituto di Elaborazione dell’Informazione, a predecessor institution to the Istituto di Scienza e Tecnologie dell'Informazione. As well as working as a researcher for the CNR, Gnesi has taught software engineering at the University of Siena and the University of Florence.

== Recognition ==
A festschrift was published in 2019, in honor of Gnesi's 65th birthday.
