= List of e-Science infrastructures =

This is a list of e-Science infrastructures, that is, of computer systems created to support the computational demands of e-Science.

- World Wide LHC Computing Grid
- European Grid Infrastructure
- Open Science Grid
- Nordic Data Grid Facility
