= Istituto di Scienza e Tecnologie dell'Informazione =

Institute of the Italian National Research Council

- Founder: CNR
- Established: 2002; 24 years ago
- Mission: Research on computer science
- Director: Roberto Scopigno
- Address: Via Giuseppe Moruzzi, 1, 56127
- Location: Pisa, Italy
- Website: www.isti.cnr.it

The "Alessandro Faedo" Istituto di Scienza e Tecnologie dell'Informazione (Institute of Information Science and Technologies) is an institute of the Italian National Research Council (CNR). The institute is located in the CNR research area in the Ghezzano Province of Pisa about 5 km from San Giuliano Terme.

The institute was founded in 2002 as a merge of two previous CNR institutes: Istituto CNUCE and Istituto di Elaborazione dell’Informazione (IEI). The institute is named in honor of Alessandro Faedo, former President of CNR and former rector of the University of Pisa, for his important contributions to the development of Computer Science in Italy. The mission of the institute is producing scientific excellence and playing an active role in technology transfer in the field of Computer Science.

In 2022 the research staff of the institute counts more than 120 researchers and a total staff (including PhD students and fellows) of around 230.

Since 1 April 2019 the ISTI director is Roberto Scopigno.

ISTI is affiliated to the CNR Dept. of Engineering, Information, Communication, Energy and Transportation Technologies (DIITET).

The main aim of ISTI-CNR is to advance science in the domain of computing and related technologies. ISTI collaborates with many universities and research institutions at both national and international levels. Collaborations are often related to specific research projects and consortiums. The Institute also has a very solid expertise and reputation in the design and deployment of CS infrastructures and in technology transfer activities oriented towards industry or the public administration. In addition, ISTI is strongly involved in didactics, at bachelor, masters and PhD levels. Many ISTI researchers hold courses or seminars in national universities or abroad.

The institute is organized in six major research themes and the subsequent 13 research laboratories:

Networking
- Wireless Networks Laboratory (WN)

Software
- Formal Methods and Tools Laboratory (FMT)
- Software Engineering and Dependable Computing Laboratory (SEDC)
- System and Software Evaluation Center (SSE)

Knowledge
- Artificial Intelligence for Media and Humanities Laboratory (AIMH)
- Human Interfaces in Information Systems Laboratory (HIIS)
- Infrastructures for Science Laboratory (InfraScience)
- Knowledge Discovery and Data Mining Laboratory (KDD)

High Performance Computing
- High Performance Computing Laboratory (HPC)

Visual
- Signals and Images Laboratory (SI)
- Visual Computing Laboratory (VC)

Flight and Structural Mechanic
- Mechanics of Materials and Structures Laboratory (MMS)
- Space Flight Dynamics Laboratory (SFD)

ISTI is intensively contributing to Open Source and Open Science policies, with the design and implementation of more than thirty software packages and tools, like, for example, the open source molecular visualization software QuteMol, the 3D mesh processing system MeshLab, the gCube system for developing Data infrastructures.

It is leading the development and operation of Data infrastructures including D4Science and OpenAIRE.

It supports and promotes the principles of Open Access and is making available its scientific production by its own Institutional Repository.
