= Carterton =

Carterton may refer to:

== England ==
- Carterton, Oxfordshire, England
- Carterton F.C.
- Carterton Community College
- Carterton (Oxfordshire) railway station

== New Zealand ==
- Carterton, New Zealand
- Carterton railway station
- Mayor of Carterton

== See also ==
- Carter (disambiguation)
- Carterville (disambiguation)
- Cartersville
- Cartersburg
