= Agent Carter =

Agent Carter may refer to:

== Media ==
- Agent Carter (film), a 2013 short film released under the Marvel One-Shots series, spun off from the Captain America feature films
- Agent Carter (TV series), a television series spin-off of the short film and the Captain America films

== Fictional characters ==
- Nick Carter (literary character), the Killmaster, a 1964 fictional secret agent revival of an 1884 fictional detective
- Peggy Carter, a supporting character of Captain America in Marvel Comics, and the main character of the short film and TV series and an agent of the SSR
  - Peggy Carter (Marvel Cinematic Universe), the live-action adaption
- Sharon Carter, a supporting character in Marvel Comics, who is a relative of Peggy Carter and an agent of S.H.I.E.L.D.
  - Sharon Carter (Marvel Cinematic Universe), the live-action adaption
- Harlow Carter, a fictional FBI agent in Empire (2015 TV series)
- Darius Carter, a fictional FBI agent in King & Maxwell
- William Carter, a character in The Bureau: XCOM Declassified

== See also ==
- Carter (disambiguation)
