= E-social science =

E-social science is 21st century development in conjunction with the wider developments in e-science. It is social science using grid computing and other information technologies to collect, process, integrate, share, and disseminate social and behavioural data.
