= Carter Township =

Carter Township may refer to:

- Carter Township, Ashley County, Arkansas
- Carter Township, Spencer County, Indiana
- Carter Township, Carter County, Missouri
- Carter Township, Burke County, North Dakota
- Carter Township, Tripp County, South Dakota

== See also ==
- Carter (disambiguation)
