= James Muri =

US Air Force officer

Lt. Col. James Perry Muri
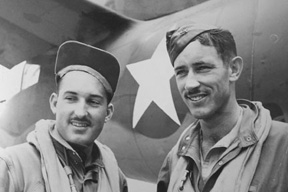
- Muri (right) with 2d Lt Pren Moore in 1942
- Born: October 19, 1918; Carterville, Montana, U.S.
- Died: February 3, 2013 (aged 94); Laurel, Montana, U.S.
- Burial place: Miles City, Montana
- Spouse: Alice Anne Moyer (m. 1941; died 2001)
- Military career
- Allegiance: United States
- Branch: United States Army Air Corps; United States Army Air Forces; United States Air Force
- Service years: 1938–1962
- Conflicts: World War II; *Pacific Campaign
- Awards: Distinguished Service Cross

James Perry Muri (October 19, 1918 – February 3, 2013) was an American World War II pilot. His United States Army Air Forces squadron helped protect Midway Island during the war by attacking a Japanese aircraft carrier task force.

== Biography ==
Born on October 19, 1918, in Carterville, Montana, his full name is James Perry Muri, and he was raised in a family of cattle ranchers. After graduating from Custer County High School in Miles City in 1936, he immediately enlisted in the United States Army Air Corps, where he was an aircraft welder for two years. He was then selected for flight training and commissioned as a second lieutenant. At Langley Field, Virginia, he learned to fly the Martin B-26 Marauder.

== Preparing for battle ==
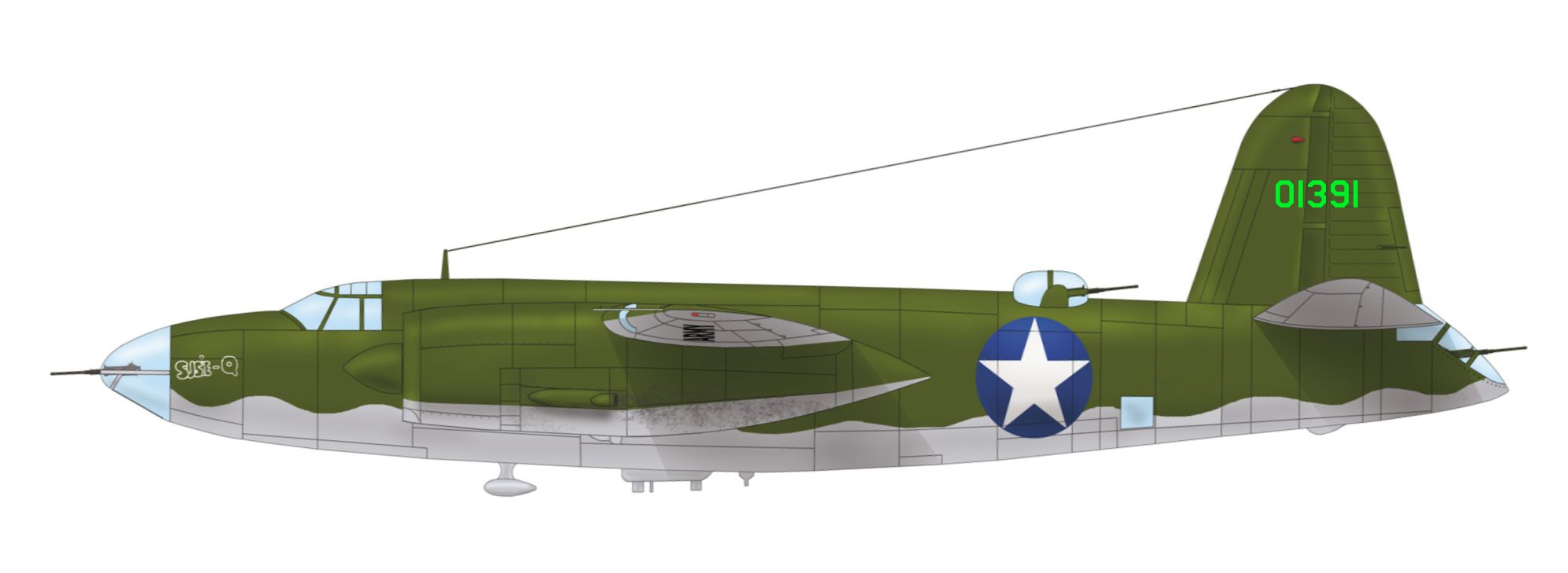
Torpedo bomber Martin B-26-MA Marauder "Susie-Q" of the 18th Reconnaissance Squadron, 22nd Bombardment Group USAAF was flown by 1/Lt James Perry Muri during the Battle of Midway on 4 June 1942

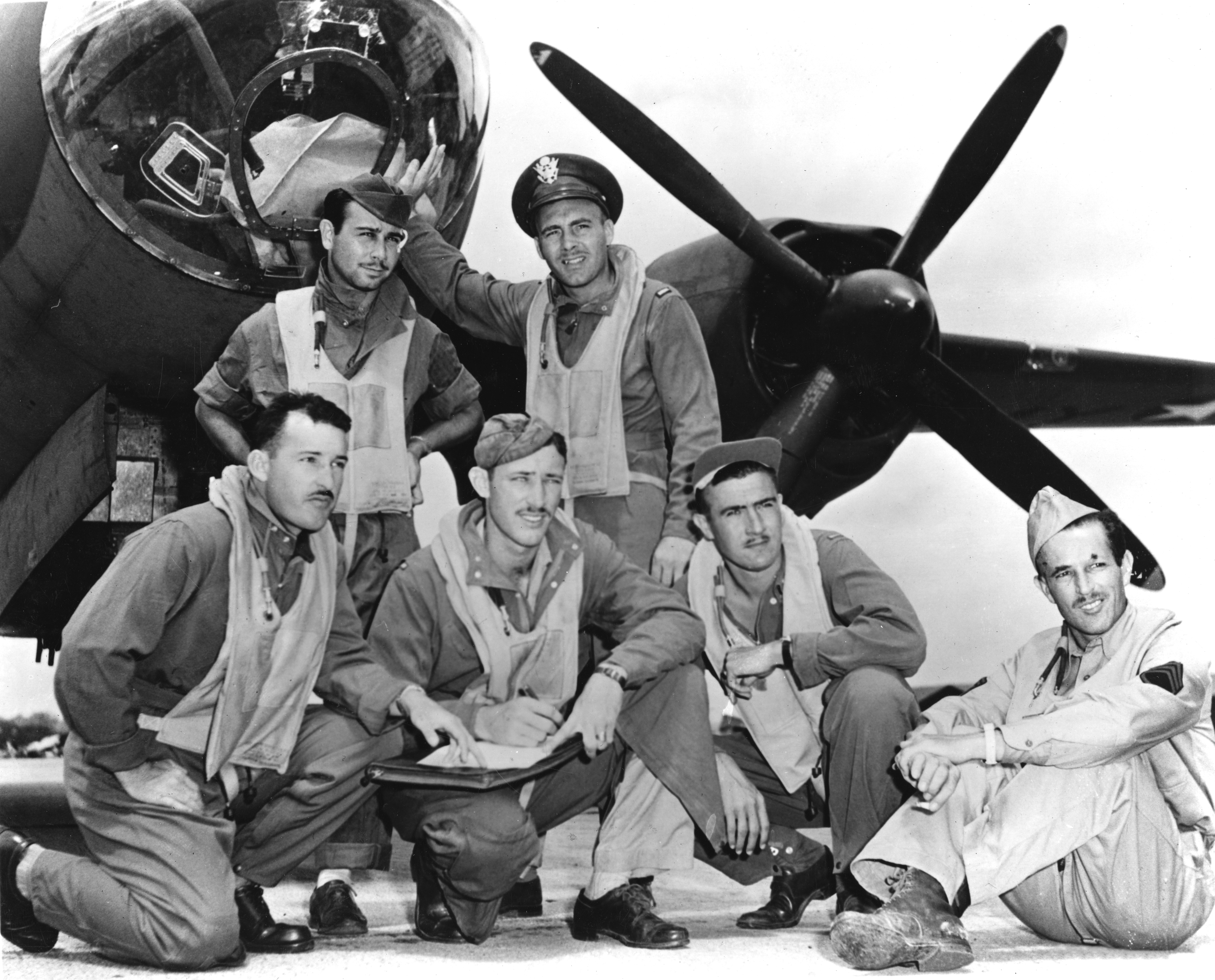
Lieutenant James Muri (front, second from left) and crew with B-26 following Battle of Midway

The day after Japan's attack on Pearl Harbor, Muri and his unit were assigned to Muroc Army Airfield, California. They had begun training with the intent of being assigned to the Pacific theater. Seven months later, Muri and his men received orders for New Guinea, flying there by way of Hawaii. While in Hawaii, Muri was assigned his own Martin B-26, which he named Susie Q, his wife's nickname. He and his unit were soon diverted to Midway Island.

In the morning of June 4, 1942, during the Battle of Midway, a Japanese aircraft carrier force was spotted approaching the island. Muri's unit received no specific training or any pre-flight briefing; they only knew the location of the aircraft carrier Akagi. On the way to its target, Muri's formation was intercepted by Japanese Zero fighters and the flight descended to 200 feet above sea level to evade the fighters' fire and the carrier's defensive guns. Muri, after dropping his torpedo and searching for a safer escape route, flew directly down the length of the Akagi while being fired upon by fighters and anti-aircraft fire, which had to hold their fire to avoid hitting their own flagship. Muri's and his unit's torpedoes failed to hit any Japanese ships, although they did shoot down one Mitsubishi A6M Zero fighter and killed two seamen aboard the Akagi with machine-gun fire.

Following the attack, he and one other B-26 pilot were able to land their planes safely on Midway Island. An inspection revealed more than 500 bullet holes in Muri's aircraft, the left tire had been shot off, and all propeller blades and every major system had been damaged. Muri was allowed to cut the plane's name from the fuselage to keep as a souvenir.

Akagi was later attacked by carrier-based Douglas SBD Dauntless dive bombers and set on fire. The carrier was later ordered to be scuttled by fleet commander Isoroku Yamamoto.

== Later military career ==
For their efforts, Muri and his crew were awarded the Distinguished Service Cross. Muri was reassigned to Eglin Field, Florida. There, he established and led the 1st Proving Ground Torpedo Squadron. He soon became a Major and commander of a detachment of the 353d Army Air Force Base Unit at what is now the regional airport in Watertown, South Dakota. He would also serve as a United States Department of State liaison in Brussels, Belgium.

== Personal life ==
In 1962, Muri retired from active duty as a lieutenant colonel after serving 24 years in military service. He had accumulated more than 5,000 flight hours. He and wife Alice returned to Bridger Creek, Montana, in 1969 and later moved to Billings in 1999. His wife died in 2001. In 2003, Muri was awarded the James Doolittle Award. On February 3, 2013, Muri died of natural causes in Laurel at the age of 94. He was buried at the Eastern Montana State Veterans Cemetery in Miles City. James had two children, 7 grandchildren and 6 great grandchildren.
