= GCube system =

Open source software system

gCube
- Developer: D4Science
- Stable release: 5.2 / 05 May 2021
- Type: Data Infrastructure
- License: European Union Public Licence (EUPL v.1.1)
- Website: www.gcube-system.org

gCube is an open source software system specifically designed and developed to enact the building and operation of a Data Infrastructure providing their users with a rich array of services suitable for supporting the co-creation of Virtual Research Environments and promoting the implementation of open science workflows and practices. It is at the heart of the D4Science Data Infrastructure.

== Overview ==
It is primarily organised in a number of web service called to offer functionality supporting the phases of knowledge production and sharing. In addition, it consists of a set of software libraries supporting service development, service-to-service integration, and service capabilities extension, and a set of portlets dedicated to realise user interface constituents facilitating the exploitation of one or more services.

It is designed and conceived to enact system of systems. In fact, its gCube services rely on standards and mediators to interact with other services as well as are made available by standard and APIs to make it possible for clients to use them. For instance, the DataMiner service implements the Web Processing Service protocol to facilitate clients to execute processes. The set of components dealing with Identity and Access Management rely on Keycloak and federates other IDMs thus making the overall Authentication and the Authorization management compliant with open standards such as OAuth2, User-Managed Access (UMA), and OpenID Connect (OIDC) protocols. The Catalogue relies on DCAT, OAI-PMH, and Catalogue Service for the Web to collect contents from other catalogues and data sources and offers its content by DCAT, OAI-PMH, and a proprietary REST API (gCat REST API).

The project utilizes a Jenkins-based CI/CD pipeline, which was designed for scalability and lower operational costs.

== History ==
gCube has been developed in the context of the D4Science initiative with the support of several EU projects.

== See also ==
- gLite
