= Pittsburgh Supercomputing Center =

Computing center in Pennsylvania, US

The Pittsburgh Supercomputing Center (PSC) is a high performance computing and networking center founded in 1986 and one of the original five NSF Supercomputing Centers. PSC is a joint effort of Carnegie Mellon University and the University of Pittsburgh in Pittsburgh, Pennsylvania, United States.

In addition to providing a family of Big Data-optimized supercomputers with unique shared memory architectures, PSC features the National Institutes of Health-sponsored National Resource for Biomedical Supercomputing, an Advanced Networking Group that conducts research on network performance and analysis, and a STEM education and outreach program supporting K-20 education. In 2012, PSC established a new Public Health Applications Group that will apply supercomputing resources to problems in preventing, monitoring and responding to epidemics and other public health needs.

== Mission ==
The Pittsburgh Supercomputing Center provides university, government, and industrial researchers with access to several of the most powerful systems for high-performance computing, communications and data-handling and analysis available nationwide for unclassified research. As a resource provider in the Extreme Science and Engineering Discovery Environment (XSEDE), the National Science Foundation's network of integrated advanced digital resources, PSC works with its XSEDE partners to harness the full range of information technologies to enable discovery in U.S. science and engineering.

== Partnerships ==
PSC is a leading partner in XSEDE. PSC-scientific co-director Ralph Roskies is a co-principal investigator of XSEDE and co-leads its Extended Collaborative Support Services. Other PSC staff lead XSEDE efforts in Networking, Incident Response, Systems & Software Engineering, Outreach, Allocations Coordination, and Novel & Innovative Projects. This NSF-funded program provides U.S. academic researchers with support for and access to leadership-class computing infrastructure and research.

The National Resource for Biomedical Supercomputing, sponsored by the National Institutes of Health, develops new algorithms, performs original research, and conducts training workshops, in addition to fostering collaborative projects and providing access to supercomputing resources to the national biomedical research community.

In partnership with the DOE National Energy Technology Laboratory, Carnegie Mellon University, the University of Pittsburgh, West Virginia University, and Waynesburg College, PSC provides resources to the SuperComputing Science Consortium, a regional partnership to advance energy and environment technologies through the application of high performance computing and communications.

== Sponsors ==
- National Science Foundation
- National Institutes of Health
- Commonwealth of Pennsylvania

== Current high-performance computing capabilities ==
- Bridges-2: Similar to Bridges, below, but with updated architecture and hardware components
- Bridges: A general purpose Hewlett Packard Enterprise system with 27,400 cores, 88 NVIDIA Volta V100s, 32 NVIDIA Tesla K80s, and 64 NVIDIA Tesla P100s. This system is shared with XSEDE researchers, and provides Regular, Large, and Extreme Shared Memory nodes, including some with GPUs. Bridges was decommissioned in early 2021 and was replaced by Bridges-2.
- Blacklight: An SGI Altix UV1000 coherent shared memory machine with 512 eight-core Intel Xeon 7500 processors (4,096 cores) with 32 terabytes of memory. It is partitioned into two connected 16-terabyte coherent shared-memory systems — creating the two largest coherent shared-memory systems in the world.
- Anton: A massively-parallel computer made by D.E. Shaw Research. It has 512-processors and is specialized for molecular dynamics.
- Sherlock: A YarcData uRiKA (Universal RDF Integration Knowledge Appliance) data appliance with PSC enhancements, Sherlock was designed to analyze graph data—data sets consisting of nodes connected by arbitrary edges—far more efficiently than a traditional computer. Massive multithreading, a shared address space, sophisticated memory optimizations, a productive user environment, and support for heterogeneous applications enables it to tackle an important family of problems that are more limited by effective use of memory than by processing speed.
- Data Supercell: A disk-based, archival storage system with high-performance access. The current capacity is 4 Petabytes. The Data Supercell storage system is managed by the SLASH2 file system software, which was developed at PSC. SLASH2 and the Data Supercell hardware architecture enables scaling well beyond the current capacity.
- Three Rivers Optical Exchange (3ROX): A high performance, large bandwidth network, 3ROX is a regional network aggregation point providing high speed commodity and research network access to sites in western and central Pennsylvania. The primary focus for the Exchange staff is providing network connectivity to the university community. They also provide network services to both community (K-12, government) and commercial entities in western Pennsylvania.

== See also ==
- National Science Foundation
- Bigben (computer)
