= Virtual research environment =

A virtual research environment (VRE) or virtual laboratory is an online system helping researchers collaborate. Features usually include collaboration support (Web forums and wikis), document hosting, and some discipline-specific tools, such as data analysis, visualisation, or simulation management. In some instances, publication management, and teaching tools such as presentations and slides may be included. VREs have become important in fields where research is primarily carried out in teams which span institutions and even countries: the ability to easily share information and research results is valuable.

The concept of the VRE was studied by UK funding agency Jisc in 2010 which highlighted issues such as researcher involvement in VRE design, sustainability, and consideration of the project as primarily one of community building rather than technology. The report also noted synonyms such as "collaborative e-research community", "collaboratory" and "virtual research community". JISC funded development of a number of VREs under its "Virtual research environment programme" from 2004 to 2011. It also launched a VRE Knowledge Base in 2011 that serves as a catalogue of international VRE projects and key literature.

A paper on VREs was produced in 2011, in the context of the GRDI2020 EU Project. It surveyed the state of the art, proposed a 10-year vision, discussed current challenges and concluded with recommendations for the evolution of the research field. The authors define VREs as "innovative, web-based, community-oriented, comprehensive, flexible, and secure working environments conceived to serve the needs of modern science".

In Australia, e-Research body NeCTAR has funding for a "virtual laboratory" program to be allocated in 2011.

Recent experiences in developing Science Gateways and Virtual Research Environments are discussed in.

== Software ==
VRE software may be built on a CMS platform (such as HUBzero), from a learning management system (such as Sakai) or through specific VRE frameworks that can be used as enabling technologies to develop and host different VREs (such as the gCube system or Microsoft Virtual Research Environment Toolkits).

== As-a-Service ==
D4Science is promoting the development of Virtual Research Environments offered via the "as a service" delivery model.

== See also ==
- Science gateway
- Computer-supported cooperative work
- Laboratory information management system
- Virtual learning environment
