= Science 2.0 =

Scientific Elementary Intermedia

Science 2.0 is a suggested new approach to science that uses information-sharing and collaboration made possible by network technologies. It is similar to the open research and open science movements and is inspired by Web 2.0 technologies. Science 2.0 stresses the benefits of increased collaboration between scientists. Science 2.0 uses collaborative tools like wikis, blogs and video journals to share findings, raw data and "nascent theories" online. Science 2.0 benefits from openness and sharing, regarding papers and research ideas and partial solutions.

A general view is that Science 2.0 is gaining traction with websites beginning to proliferate, yet at the same time there is considerable resistance within the scientific community about aspects of the transition as well as discussion about what, exactly, the term means. There are several views that there is a "sea change" happening in the status quo of scientific publishing, and substantive change regarding how scientists share research data. There is considerable discussion in the scientific community about whether scientists should embrace the model and exactly how Science 2.0 might work, as well as several reports that many scientists are slow to embrace collaborative methods and are somewhat "inhibited and slow to adopt a lot of online tools."

== Definitions ==
Current model	Emerging model
Research done privately; then submitted to journals; then peer-reviewed by gatekeepers in major journals; published	Research data shared during discovery stages; ideas shared; scientists collaborate; then findings are disseminated online
Scientific literature behind paywalls online	Scientific discoveries free online
Credit established by journal name or journal impact factor.	Credit established by citation count, number of views or downloads.
Data is private until publication	Data is shared before publication
Papers generally protected by copyright	Many different licenses possible: copyright, public domain, Creative Commons 3.0, etc.
Publishers raise funds by charging for access to content	Publishers seek alternative funding models
Journal article summaries available online after publication	Share methods, data, findings via blogs, social networking sites, wikis, computer networking, Internet, video journals

The term has many meanings and continues to evolve in scientific parlance. It not only describes what is currently happening in science, but describes a direction in which proponents believe science should move towards, as well as a growing number of websites which promote free scientific collaboration.

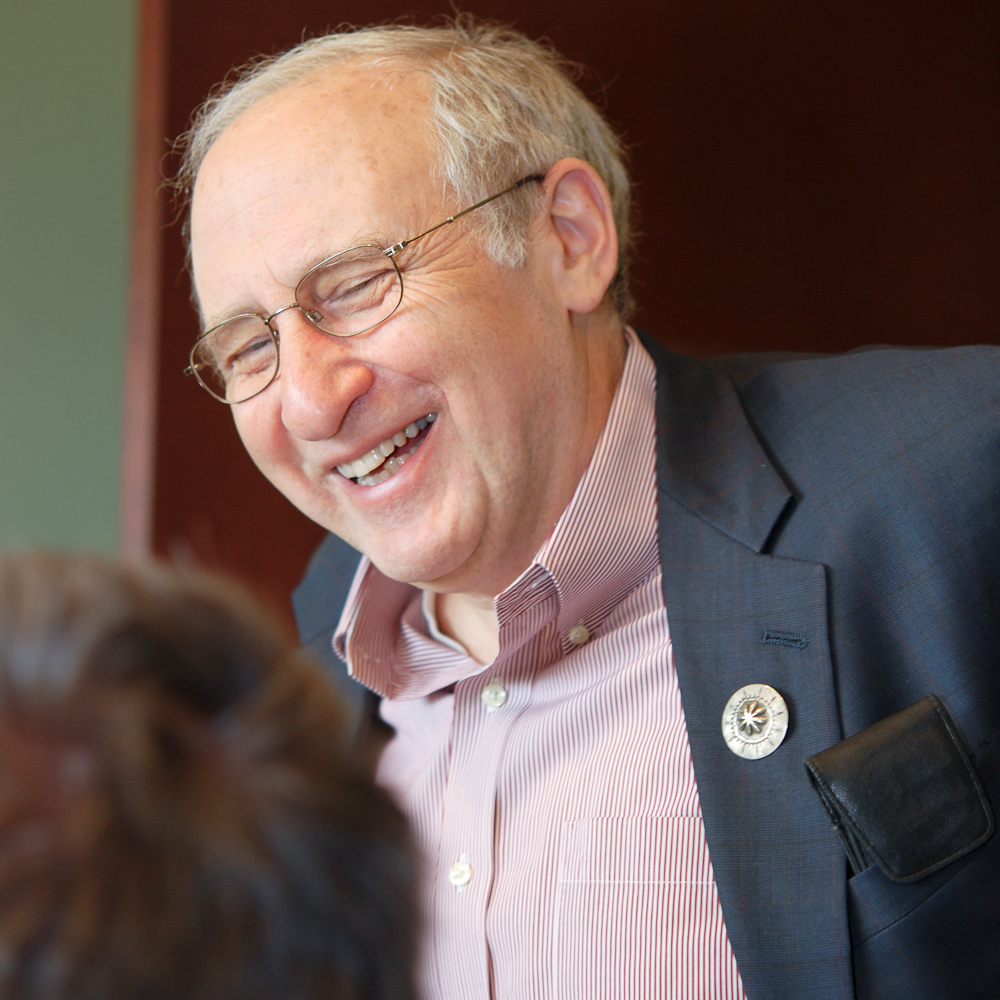
Ben Shneiderman

The term Science 2.0 suggests a contrast between traditional ways of doing science, often denoted Science 1.0, with more collaborative approaches, and suggests that the new forms of science will work with Web 2.0 technologies. One description from Science is that Science 2.0 uses the "networking power of the internet to tackle problems with multiple interacting variables - the problems, in other words, of everyday life." A different and somewhat controversial view is that of Ben Shneiderman, who suggested that Science 2.0 combines hypothesis-based inquiries with social science methods, partially for the purpose of improving those new networks.

While the term describes websites for sharing scientific knowledge, it also includes efforts by existing science publishers to embrace new digital tools, such as offering areas for discussions following published online articles. Sometimes it denotes open access which, according to one view, means that the author continues to hold the copyright but that others can read it and use it for reasonable purposes, provided that the attribution is maintained. Most online scientific literature is behind paywalls, meaning that a person can find the title of an article on Google but they can not read the actual article. People who can access these articles are generally affiliated with a university or secondary school or library or other educational institution, or who pay on a per-article or subscription basis.

Traditional scientific journals are part of this social evolution too, innovating ways to engage scientists online and enable global collaboration and conversation. Even the 187-year-old Annals of the New York Academy of Sciences has joined the digital age. The Academy now permits free public access to selected online content and has digitized every volume dating back to 1823.

— Adrienne J. Burke in Seed Magazine, 2012

One view is that Science 2.0 should include an effort by scientists to offer papers in non-technical language, as a way of reaching out to non-scientists. For others, it includes building vast databases of case histories. There is a sense in which Science 2.0 indicates a general direction for scientific collaboration, although there is little clarity about how exactly this might happen. One aim is to "make scientific collaboration as easy as sharing videos of trips home from the dentist," according to one view.

Closely related terms are "cyberscience" focussing on scientists communicating in the cyberspace and "cyberscience 2.0" expanding the notion to the emerging trend of academics using Web 2.0 tools.

== History and background ==
The rise of the Internet has transformed many activities such as retailing and information searching. In journalism, Internet technologies such as blogging, tagging and social networking have caused many existing media sources such as newspapers to "adopt whole new ways of thinking and operating," according to a report in Scientific American in 2008. The idea is that while the Internet has transformed many aspects of life, it has not changed scientific research as much as it could. While firms such as eBay, Amazon and Netflix have changed consumer retailing, and online patient-centered medical data has enabled better health care, Science 2.0 advocate Ben Shneiderman said:

It's time for researchers in science to take network collaboration like this to the next phase and reap the potential intellectual and societal payoffs.

— Ben Shneiderman, 2008

According to one view, a similar web-inspired transformation that has happened to other areas is now happening to science. The general view is that science has been slower than other areas to embrace the web technology, but that it is beginning to catch up.

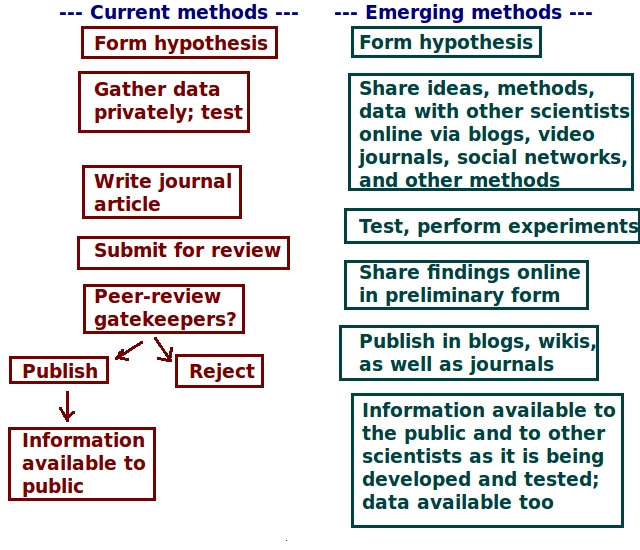

Before the Internet, scientific publishing has been described as a "highly integrated and controlled process." Research was done in private. Next, it was submitted to scientific publications and reviewed by editors and gatekeepers and other scientists. Last, it was published. This has been the traditional pathway of scientific advancement, sometimes dubbed Science 1.0.

Established journals provided a "critical service", according to one view. Publications such as Science and Nature have large editorial staffs to manage the peer-review process as well as have hired fact-checkers and screeners to look over submissions. These publications get revenue from subscriptions, including online ones, as well as advertising revenue and fees paid by authors. According to advocates of Science 2.0, however, this process of paper-submission and review was rather long. Detractors complained that the system is "hidebound, expensive and elitist", sometimes "reductionist", as well as being slow and "prohibitively costly". Only a select group of gatekeepers—those in charge of the traditional publications—limited the flow of information. Proponents of open science claimed that scientists could learn more and learn faster if there is a "friction-free collaboration over the Internet."

Yet there is considerable resistance within the scientific community to a change of approach. The act of publishing a new finding in a major journal has been at the "heart of the career of scientists," according to one view, which elaborated that many scientists would be reluctant to sacrifice the "emotional reward" of having their discoveries published in the usual, traditional way. Established scientists are often loath to switch to an open-source model, according to one view.

Timo Hannay explained that the traditional publish-a-paper model, sometimes described as "Science 1.0", was a workable one but there need to be other ways for scientists to make contributions and get credit for their work:

The unit of contribution to the scientific knowledge base has become the paper. Journals grew up as a means for scientists to be able to share their discoveries and ideas. The incentive for doing so was that by publishing in journals their contributions would be recognized by citation and other means. So you have this pact: be open with your ideas and share them through journals and you will get credit... There are all kinds of ways in which scientists can contribute to the global endeavor. ... The incentive structure has not caught up with what we really want scientists to do.

— Timo Hannay, 2012

In 2008, a scientist at the University of Maryland named Ben Shneiderman wrote an editorial entitled Science 2.0. Shneiderman argued that Science 2.0 was about studying social interactions in the "real world" with study of e-commerce, online communities and so forth. A writer in Wired Magazine criticized Shneiderman's view, suggesting that Shneiderman's call for more collaboration, more real-world tests, and more progress should not be called "Science 2.0" or "Science 1.0" but simply science.

There are reports that established journals are moving towards greater openness. Some help readers network online; others enable commenters to post links to websites; others make papers accessible after a certain period of time has elapsed. But it remains a "hotly debated question", according to one view, whether the business of scientific research can move away from the model of "peer-vetted, high-quality content without requiring payment for access." The topic has been discussed in a lecture series at the California Institute of Technology. Proponent Adam Bly thinks that the key elements needed to transform Science 2.0 are "vision" and "infrastructure":

Open science is not this maverick idea; it's becoming reality. About 35 percent of scientists are using things like blogs to consume and produce content. There is an explosion of online tools and platforms available to scientists, ranging from Web 2.0 tools modified or created for the scientific world to Web sites that are doing amazing things with video, lab notebooks, and social networking. There are thousands of scientific software programs freely available online and tens of millions of science, technology, and math journal articles online. What's missing is the vision and infrastructure to bring together all of the various changes and new players across this Science 2.0 landscape so that it's simple, scalable, and sustainable—so that it makes research better.

— Adam Bly, 2012

== Proliferation on the web ==
Benefits of Science 2.0	Drawbacks of Science 2.0
more productive	difficulty getting credit for discoveries
more collaborative	difficulty getting paid
more collegial working environment
freer, less expensive	risk others will copy preliminary work to get credit, patents, money
faster development	how will reviewers and editors get paid?
wider access	it is not clear how Science 2.0 will work
diverse applications: homeland security, medical care, environment etc.	needs infrastructure
easier
lets other scientists see results instantly and comment

There are numerous examples of more websites offering opportunities for scientific collaboration.

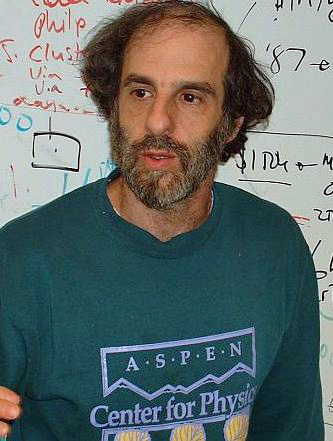
Paul Ginsparg helped develop the arXiv online database, which is now run by Cornell University.

- Public Library of Science. This project, sometimes termed PLoS, is a nonprofit open-access scientific publishing project aimed at creating a library of open access journals and other scientific literature under an open content license. By 2012, it publishes seven peer reviewed journals. It makes scientific papers immediately available online without charges for access or restrictions on passing them along, provided that the authors and sources are properly cited with the Creative Commons Attribution License. According to one report, the PLoS has gained "pretty wide acceptance" although many researchers in biomedicine still hope to be published in established journals such as Nature, Cell, and Science, according to one report. PLoS publishes 600 articles a month in 2012.
- arXiv, pronounced archive, is an online-accessible archive for electronic preprints of scientific papers in the fields of mathematics, physics, astronomy, computer science, quantitative biology, statistics, and quantitative finance.
- Galaxy Zoo is an online astronomy project which invites members of the public to assist in the morphological classification of large numbers of galaxies. It has been termed a citizen science project. The information has led to a substantial increase in scientific papers, according to one account.
- A website entitled Science 2.0 lets scientists share information. It has been cited by numerous publications, many of which have been written stories with links to Science 2.0 articles such as USA Today, CNN, the Wall Street Journal, the New York Times, and others. The Science 2.0 topics included neutrino interactions, cosmic rays, the human eye's evolution, the relation between sex and marital happiness for elderly couples, human evolution, hearing loss, and other topics.
- OpenWetWare is a wiki site started by biologists at the Massachusetts Institute of Technology to foster open research, education, and discussion in the biological sciences and engineering.
- Some examples of pioneering use of Science 2.0 to foster biodiversity surveys were popularized by Robert Dunn, including urban Arthropods and human body bacteria.
- OpenWorm is a collaborative research project with several publications that aims to simulate the nervous system, body mechanics, and environment of the C. elegans worm.

== See also ==
- Crowdsourcing
- eScience
