= Carter Islands =

Offshore island group

- Location within Nunavut Location within Canada

Geography
- Location: Frobisher Bay
- Coordinates: 63°41′59″N 068°52′00″W
- Archipelago: Arctic Archipelago

Administration
- Canada
- Territory: Nunavut
- Region: Qikiqtaaluk

Demographics
- Population: Uninhabited

One of the Baffin Island offshore island groups, the Carter Islands are located in Frobisher Bay, west/southwest of Iqaluit. They are part of the Qikiqtaaluk Region, in the Canadian territory of Nunavut.
