= Victoria Stodden =

Professor of statistics

- Education: University of Ottawa; University of British Columbia; Stanford University
- Known for: Reproducible Research Standard
- Scientific career
- Fields: Statistics
- Workplaces: University of Illinois
- Doctoral advisor: David Donoho

Victoria Stodden is a statistician, associate professor of information sciences, and affiliate professor of statistics at the University of Southern California. She earned a B.A. in economics from the University of Ottawa, an MS in economics from the University of British Columbia, and both her law degree and a Ph.D. in statistics from Stanford University.

== Work ==
Stodden's work focuses on facilitating the reproducibility of research, specifically in computational sciences. She is the founder of "Reproducible Research Standard" and the website ResearchCompendia.org, which was announced in 2015 to enable public verification of research and methods but went defunct in 2016. In 2020, Stodden proposed a set of guidelines for researchers working in data science, including the role of reproducible research.

Her current focus lies in scientific research incentives, having said: "A big part of the work I am doing concerns the scientific reward structure. For example, my work on the Reproducible Research Standard is an effort to realign the intellectual property rules scientists are subject to, to be closer to our scientific norms."

Emails released by the Department of Justice show that between 2009 and 2011, Stodden and Jeffrey Epstein maintained what appears to be a close, often flirtatious relationship.

== Publications ==
- "Four Simple Recommendations to Encourage Best Practices in Research Software," Jiminez et al., F1000Research 2017, 6:876 (doi: 10.12688/f1000research.11407.1), June 13, 2017.
- "Fostering Integrity in Research" Committee Members, National Academies Report, April 11, 2017.
- Privacy, Big Data, and the Public Good: Frameworks for Engagement, Lane, J., Stodden, V., Bender, S., and Nissenbaum, H. (eds). 2014.
- "Reproducibility and replicability of rodent phenotyping in preclinical studies," Kafkafi et al, bioarxiv, 2016.
- "Facilitating Reproducibility in Scientific Computing: Principles and Practice," David H. Bailey, Jonathan M. Borwein and Victoria Stodden, in Harald Atmanspacher and Sabine Maasen, eds, Reproducibility: Principles, Problems, Practices, John Wiley and Sons, New York, 2016.
