= E-Science librarianship =

E-Science librarianship refers to a role for librarians in e-Science.

== Early scholars ==
Early references to e-Science and librarianship involve information studies scholars researching cyberinfrastructure and emerging networked information and knowledge communities. Notably Christine Borgman, Professor and Presidential Chair in Information Studies at the University of California, Los Angeles (UCLA) was a key player in bringing e-Science, and the idea of networked knowledge communities, to the attention of the library profession. In 2004, as a visiting fellow at the Oxford Internet Institute, she conducted research and lectured publicly on e-Science, Digital Libraries, and Knowledge Communities. In 2007 Anna K. Gold, formerly of MIT and Cal Poly, San Luis Obispo, authored a series of articles in D-Lib Magazine that opened the door for academic libraries to begin exploring roles, skills, and strategies for engaging in e-Science: Cyberinfrastructure, Data, and Libraries, Part 1: A Cyberinfrastructure Primer for Librarians and Cyberinfrastructure, Data, and Libraries, Part 2: Libraries and the Data Challenge: Roles and Actions for Libraries.

== Academic research and health sciences libraries ==
In 2007, the Association of Research Libraries (ARL) e-Science task force issued its report on e-Science and librarianship. The ARL's report encouraged its member libraries to position themselves to engage with researchers involved in e-Science (eScience) by cultivating new research support strategies and developing their digital scholarship infrastructure.

E-Science has multiple attributes; Tony and Jessie Hey framed e-Science for the library community by characterizing it as a research methodology: "e-Science is not a new scientific discipline in its own right: e-Science is shorthand for the set of tools and technologies required to support collaborative, networked science".

In addition to academic libraries' interests in providing support for their researchers engaging in e-Science, the health sciences library community also emerged as a major proponent for creating librarian positions for supporting the information needs of large-scale, networked, research collaborations on their campuses. Neil Rambo, current director of NYU's Health Sciences Library and former director of University of Washington Health Sciences Library, was the first to use the term in the Journal of the Medical Library Association, in his 2009 editorial e-Science and the Biomedical Library. Rambo's definition of e-Science highlighted the potential e-Science held for creating data as a research product: "E-science is a new research methodology, fueled by networked capabilities and the practical possibility of gathering and storing vast amounts of data." In response to this article the University of Massachusetts Medical School Lamar Soutter Library and National Network of Libraries of Medicine, New England Region encouraged health sciences libraries to cooperate to identify skills and develop a program for training e-Science Librarians.

Then, in 2013, Shannon Bohle, an archivist who was employed in the library at Cold Spring Harbor Laboratory, an NCI-designated basic cancer research facility, used experience gained there and previous papers and presentations about preserving scientific archival materials to expand the traditional definition of e-Science by including the terms, principles, and practices used in archival science. These included in the definition the "long-term storage and accessibility of all materials generated through the scientific process," as well as examples of material types traditionally preserved in archives, like "electronic/digitized laboratory notebooks, raw and fitted data sets, manuscript production and draft versions, pre-prints," as well as library materials ("print and/or electronic publications").

== Roles ==
Many areas of science are about to be transformed by the availability of vast amounts of new scientific data that can potentially provide insights at a level of detail never before envisaged. However, this new data dominant era brings new challenges for the scientists and they will need the skills and technologies both of computer scientists and of the library community to manage, search and curate these new data resources. Libraries will not be immune from change in this new world of research.

— Tony and Jessie Hey

Karen Williams identifies roles in the following areas for librarians in the developing world of e-Science.

- Campus Engagement
- Content/Collection Development and Management
- Teaching and Learning
- Scholarly Communication
- E-Scholarship and Digital Tools
- Reference/Help Services
- Outreach
- Fund Raising
- Exhibit and Event Planning
- Leadership

== Challenges for research libraries ==
E-science tends toward inter- and multidisciplinary approaches that depend on computation and computer science. Research libraries have traditionally been discipline focused and, although increasingly technologically sophisticated, do not have systems of the scale or complexity of the e-science environment. E-science is data intensive, but research libraries have not typically been responsible for scientific data. E-science is frequently conducted in a team context, often distributed across multiple institutions and on a global scale. The primary constituency of libraries generally comprises those affiliated with the local institution. Licenses for electronic content are typically restricted to a particular institutional community, and the infrastructure to move institutional licenses into a multi-institutional environment is not well developed. E-science challenges all these traditional paradigms of research library organization and services.

— Neil Rambo

== Skills ==
Garritano & Carlson were among the first to outline a skill set for librarians seeking to support the data needs of e-Science; they identified five skill categories librarians new to this area should expect to adapt or develop when participating on such projects:

- Library and information science expertise
- Subject expertise
- Partnerships and outreach (both internal and external)
- Participating in sponsored research
- Balancing workload

An example of librarians reconfiguring traditional librarian skills to meet the needs of researchers engaging in e-Science is Witt & Carlson's adaptation of the traditional reference interview into a "data interview" in order to provide effective data management and e-Science services. This interview consists of ten practical queries necessary for understanding the provenance and expectations for the preservation of datasets typical of e-Science that also help illustrate some of the educational tools and skills needed by a librarian new to e-Science. "What is the story of the data? What form and format are the data in? What is the expected lifespan of the dataset? How could the data be used, reused, and repurposed? How large is the dataset, and what is its rate of growth? Who are the potential audiences for the data? Who owns the data? Does the dataset include any sensitive information? What publications or discoveries have resulted from the data? How should the data be made accessible?"

== Resources ==
In 2009 the Lamar Soutter Library at the University of Massachusetts Medical School (UMMS) and the National Network of Libraries of Medicine, New England Region (NN/LM NER) funded an e-Science program for building the skills highlighted above for librarians. Elaine Russo Martin, Director of Library Services at the Lamar Soutter Library and Director of the NN/LM NER developed this comprehensive e-Science program to build librarians' subject expertise in the sciences, developing their data management skills, and their familiarity with cyberinfrastructure and e-Science. Three major products of this program are the e-Science web portal for librarians, the E-Science Symposium, and the New England Collaborative Data Management Curriculum (NECDMC). This portal includes educational resources for specific tools and subject/discipline tutorials and modules to assist librarians new to e-Science. UMMS and NN/LM NER also publish an open access journal called the Journal of eScience Librarianship.
