= Carter Machinery =

American lubricant producer

Carter Machinery, founded in Virginia in 1927, is the authorized Caterpillar equipment dealer serving Virginia, Delaware, Washington D.C., and portions of West Virginia. By the 1980s, it also became the largest dealer in Caterpillar equipment in the United States, and it was acquired by Caterpillar, Inc. in 1988. Caterpillar contended that the acquisition, breaking its tradition of having only independent dealerships, was necessary to protect its right to dictate who could sell and service their product in the state of Virginia. Carter was bought out by its management in 2011, again becoming an independent dealer for Caterpillar.

== Major Milestones ==
- 1927 – Virginia Tractor Company is founded.
- 1952 – Carter Machinery Company, Inc. officially founded.
- 1955 – Bluefield, WV store opened.
- 1957 – Norton, VA store opened.
- 1962 – Corporate headquarters moved to present location in Salem, VA.
- 1965 – Norton, VA store moved to an expanded facility. 1975 – Reconditioning Center, created to rebuild major components and machines, opened at Salem headquarters.
- 1977 – Oakwood, VA store opened.
- 1982 – Eastern Virginia territory, served by Virginia Tractor Company, acquired and combined under Carter Machinery, adding four stores: Chesapeake, Fishersville, Norfolk and Richmond, VA. During the same year, a new store in Pineville, WV was opened.
- 1985 – Warrenton, VA store opened.
- 1986 – Newport News store opened.
- 1990 – Fredericksburg and Richmond Power Systems Division stores opened.
- 1991 – Lynchburg store opened.
- 1993 – Roanoke Power Systems Division store opened.
- 1995 – Chesapeake Power Systems Division store opened.
- 1996 – Roanoke General Construction Division store opened.
- 1997 – Fishersville, VA store moved to present location.
- 1999 – Richmond Power Systems Division store moved to present location.
- 2000 – South Hill and Chesterfield stores opened.
- 2001 – Lynchburg store moved to present location.
- 2006 – Pineville, WV and Abingdon, VA stores moved to new, expanded facilities. Harrisonburg store opened.
- 2007 – Carter Machinery purchased the Virginia assets of Pioneer Machinery, the Cat Forest Products dealer.
- 2008 – Harrisonburg store moved to its present location.
- 2009 – Newport News and Yorktown stores moved to new, combined location in Williamsburg.
- 2010 – Bluefield, WV store moved to new location in Princeton, WV.
- 2011 – Change of ownership from Caterpillar Inc. as a result of a management led buyout.
- 2013 – Carter Machinery became the exclusive Blue Bird Bus dealer in the state of Virginia.
- 2013 – Carter Machinery acquired the expanded Cat Mining equipment distribution and support business for our territories from Caterpillar Global Mining LLC.
- 2020 - Carter Machinery acquired Alban Tractor Company, the Cat dealer for Maryland and Delaware.

== Investments ==
In May 2018 Carter Machinery invested an undisclosed amount in Used Equipment Guide.
