= Carter's Foods =

American supermarket chain

- Industry: Retail
- Founded: 1952
- Defunct: 2006
- Fate: Bankrupt, Liquidated
- Headquarters: Charlotte, Michigan, United States
- Key people: Theodore Carter (founder)
- Products: bakery, beer, dairy, deli, frozen foods, general merchandise, liquor, meat, produce, seafood, wine

Carter's Foods, more commonly known as Carter's, was an employee-owned supermarket chain based in Charlotte, Michigan, United States. Founded in 1952, Carter's grew to over 30 stores throughout Michigan's Lower Peninsula, including two in Charlotte. In 2006, the chain declared bankruptcy, with its remaining stores being liquidated or sold. Until the chain's demise, Carter's Foods was the only grocery chain in Michigan to be entirely owned by its employees.

== History ==
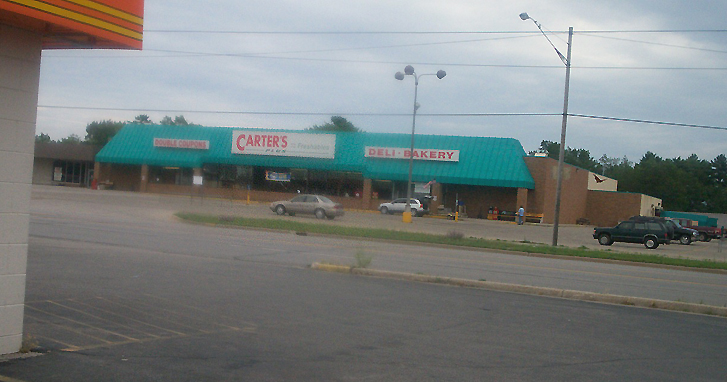
Former Carter's Foods in Oscoda, Michigan, originally A&P. This store is now Roger's Foods and Ace Hardware.

Carter's Foods was founded in 1952 by Theodore Carter. A native of Charlotte, Michigan, Theodore had been an employee of the Kroger store in his hometown. Carter's expanded over several decades, mainly by acquiring IGA store. IGA also was the primary supplier for Carter's.

In 1999, Sperry and Hutchinson, a company known for its S&H Green Stamps, introduced an updated rewards program, S&H Greenpoints; Carter's was the first chain in Michigan to utilize Greenpoints. In 2000, Carter's Foods became 100 percent employee-owned, becoming the only supermarket chain in Michigan to be employee-owned.

Citing competition from Walmart and regional supercenter chain Meijer, Carter's filed for Chapter 7 bankruptcy in 2006, after it was unable to pay several million dollars in debts to its suppliers. The last Carter's stores closed in mid-2006. Several were reverted to IGA or sold to Spartan Stores, while the remainder were shuttered.
