= Carterville, Montana =

- Unincorporated community
- Location within Montana Location within the United States
- Coordinates: 46°17′58″N 106°28′03″W
- Country: United States
- State: Montana
- County: Rosebud
- Elevation: 2,503 ft (763 m)
- Time zone: UTC-7 (Mountain (MST))
  - Summer (DST): UTC-6 (MDT)
- Area code: 406
- GNIS feature ID: 769633

Carterville (or Cartersville) is an unincorporated community in Rosebud County, Montana, United States.

== History ==
Carterville (variant name Cartersville) was platted with streets and lots early in the 1900s. The village eventually had a general store, grocery store, post office, beer tavern, elementary school serving grades 1–8, and Milwaukee railroad depot. The businesses closed in the 1950s. The post office was established in 1909, and remained in operation until it was discontinued in 1957. The post office building also housed a small grocery store. Carterville Elementary School taught grades 1-8 until the late 1950s, and grades 1-6 later. The elementary school report cards issued to students stated that the school name was Carterville (not Cartersville). Students in higher grades would be bused to Rosebud High School, located south of Yellowstone River in Rosebud, Montana. Farmers and ranchers in the area continue to benefit from the Carterville Irrigation Dam Project, supplying a canal of water originating at a diversion dam in the Yellowstone River in Forsyth, Montana. The canal is 27 miles long, and serves 9,793 acres planted in alfalfa, corn, wheat, and other grains. Milwaukee Railroad operated a railroad depot in Carterville, and closed before the railroad suspended operation, and right-of-way lands sold back to landowners.

The community was named for Thomas H. Carter, a United States Senator from Montana who owned land there.

== Notable person ==
- James Muri, United States World War II pilot
