= Carter County =

Carter County is the name of five counties in the United States:

- Carter County, Kentucky
- Carter County, Missouri
- Carter County, Montana
- Carter County, Oklahoma
- Carter County, Tennessee

== See also ==
- Carter Country, a TV series (1977–1979)
