= Carter, Arkansas =

- Historical unincorporated community
- Carter's position in Arkansas.
- Coordinates: 35°55′37″N 94°3′8″W
- Country: United States
- State: Arkansas
- County: Washington
- Township: White River
- Elevation: 1,335 ft (407 m)
- Time zone: UTC-6 (Central (CST))
  - Summer (DST): UTC-5 (CDT)
- ZIP code: 72701
- Area code: 479
- GNIS feature ID: 65300

Carter (1960–2018) was an unincorporated community in Washington County, Arkansas, United States. It is located on Arkansas Highway 74 between Arnett and Sulphur City. At times it was also known as Carter's Store, Carter Store, and Hicks. A post office, for all these names at different times existed from 1875 to 1953. The community has the name of John C. Carter, first postmaster.
