= Data cooperative =

A data cooperative is a group of individuals voluntarily pooling together their data. As an entity, a data cooperative is a type of data infrastructure, formed through the voluntary and collaborative pooling efforts of individuals. Data cooperatives allow individuals to get paid for the data they create and to exercise more pricing power than they would have on their own or in an- other type of data exchange. Examples include cooperatives of music artists, video producers, and gig workers. The income is not a subsidy, but rather the result of individual economic activity channeled through exchanges that aggregate the data of producers and workers, thereby turning individuals into data entrepreneurs. As a data infrastructure, data cooperatives are created, owned and operated by community members, and this enables the communities, and its members, to have full control over their data, and the decisions that are made by the insights gathered from the data. By giving individual community members control over their data, data cooperatives are a new and innovative type of data infrastructure, that act as a counter weight against data brokers and data driven corporations.

== Key aspects ==
=== Ownership rights ===
One key aspect of data cooperatives is that the individual members of a data cooperative have control and legal ownership over their data. As a key aspect, ownership rights also refers to the notion that all members of a data cooperative must be able to collect copies of their data. This can be done either automatically through electronic means (e.g. passive data-traffic copying software on their devices) or it can be done by manually uploading data files to the cooperative. The data that is collected is stored in a members personal data store (PDS). Within an individual's personal data store, members have the ability to add, remove or restrict access to personal data.

=== Fiduciary obligations to members ===
This key aspect of data cooperatives refers to the legally bound obligations that cooperatives have to its members. Data cooperatives are member owned and member run, and there needs to be a set of rules (bylaws), that govern the cooperative, and have been agreed on by all members. The main factor that these rules cover are policies regarding the usage and or access of member owned data.

=== Direct benefit to members ===
This key aspect refers to the overall desired goals outcomes of a data cooperative. Data cooperatives must provide benefit to all members of the cooperative. Data cooperatives accomplish this by analyzing the data and identifying useful insights amongst the data, that is then shared to the members of the cooperative.

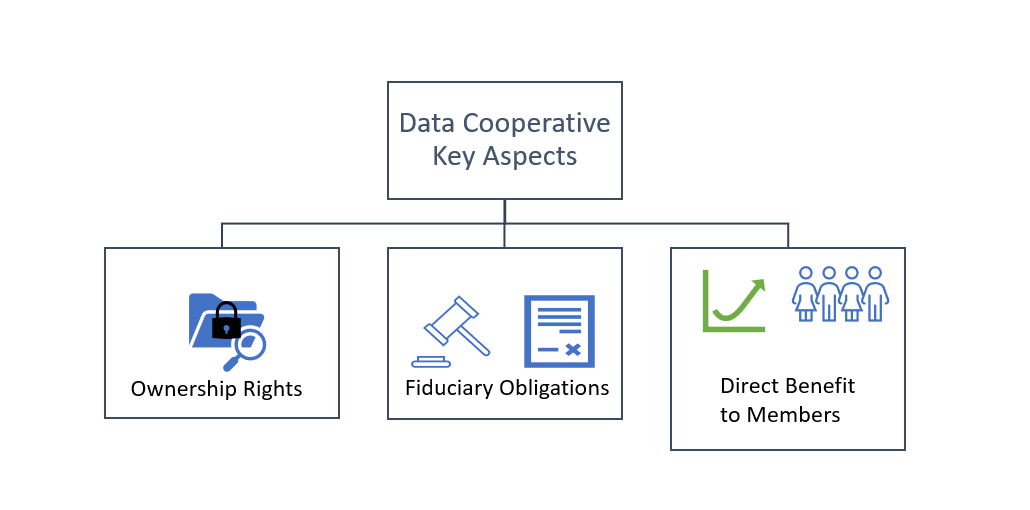
Flow Chart of a Data Cooperatives Key Aspects

== Counter weight to data power imbalances ==
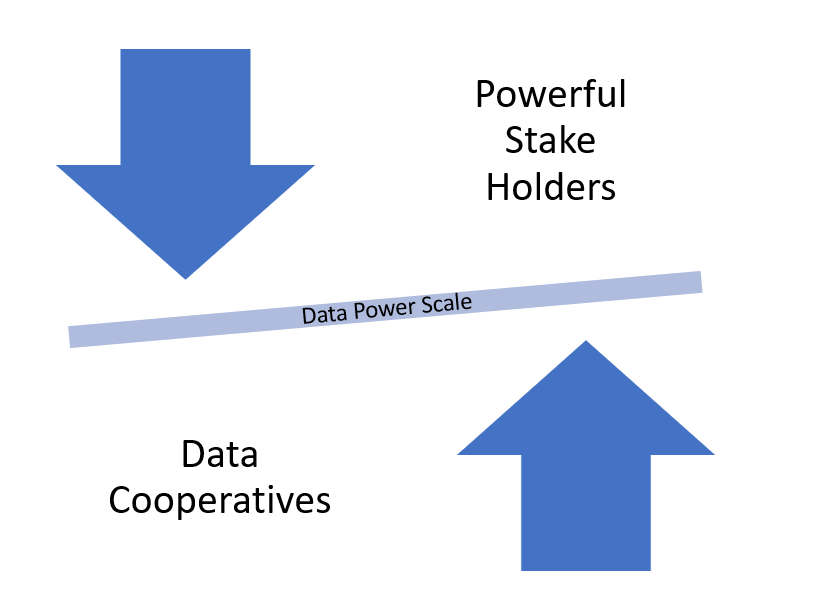
Data Power Scale

Within contemporary societies, "data" - as a commodity - is continuously becoming more valuable. Over the past decade, the control of data has been concentrated between a limited number of actors, such as; 'big tech' companies (e.g. Facebook & Google) and government entities. By forming a data cooperative, citizens can actively establish themselves as stakeholders within the world's data economy. Through creating stakeholders, data cooperatives contribute to evening out the data power imbalances by competing against, and impeding on the data monopolies that the 'big tech' companies and government entities have.

"All of this [data] has value to the producer, and when the producer gains control over that value, incentives will be transformed; a market participant will try to persuade the buyer to spend money with them instead of paying monopolistic platforms to manipulate a targeted person." - A Blueprint for a Better Digital Society (2018)

== Ecosystem ==
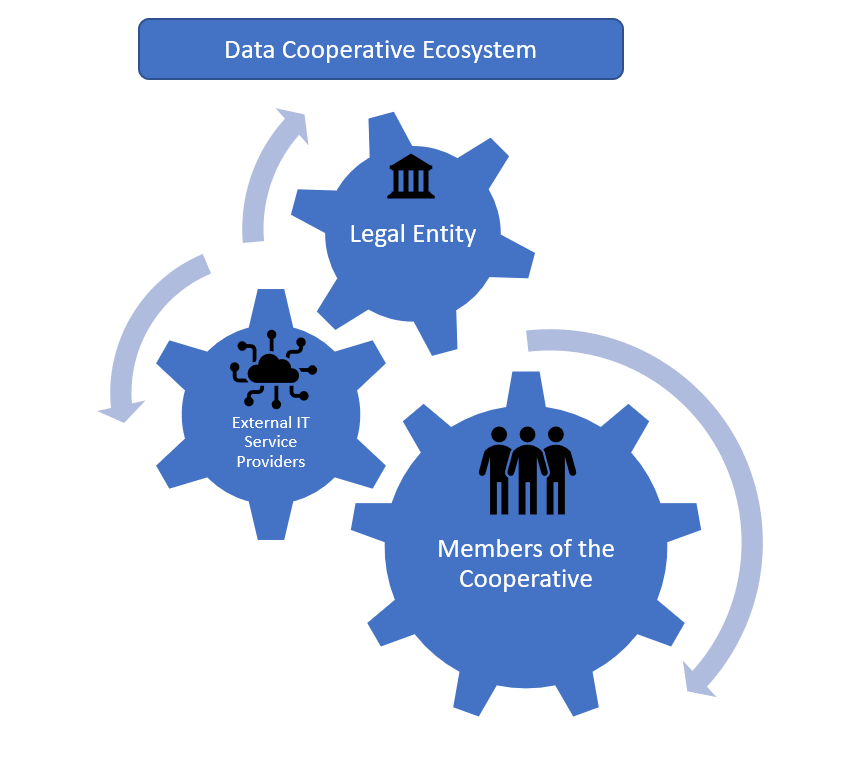
Data Cooperative Ecosystem

=== Main entities ===
The three main entities that make up a data cooperative are:

1. Data cooperative as a legal entity.
2. The individuals who make up the cooperative.
3. The entities that are external to the cooperative, but still interact with it. This entity refers to the IT services providers who are giving the data cooperative it's IT infrastructure functionalities.

==== Proposed legal entities ====
In their 2018 article in the Harvard Business Review, computer scientist Jaron Lanier and political economist Glen Weyl propose a new type of legal entity to enable data cooperativism: Mediators of Individual Data (MIDs). MIDs, they argue, could offer an institutional innovation for enabling data cooperativism by bridging the gap between users and digital platforms. MIDs would act as fiduciaries, managing data on behalf of individuals and groups while ensuring transparency, privacy, and equitable benefit-sharing. They provide an essential legal and operational framework work data cooperatives by:

1. Negotiating fair compensation for data contributors.
2. Enforcing quality standards and protecting privacy.
3. Supporting long-term sustainability through mechanisms like royalty streams.

MIDs have the potential to serve as a backbone for a "dignified information economy, where individuals maintain control over their data while participating in cooperative and market-based systems."

== Examples ==
=== Ride-share automobile drivers (e.g. Uber, Lyft, etc.) ===
Currently, drivers for ride-share services have no effective way to compare their respective incomes across similar routes, areas and distances. Similarly, people who use these ride-share services don't have a way to compare average fees between similar trips people take. The members of a ride-share automobile service community could form a data cooperative by pooling together data accessible to them on their devices, and use the data to see whether on average they are receiving a similar quality of service and equitable earnings across a wide geographic area.

=== Social media ===
A data cooperative for social media users could allow them to manage the data generated by their engagement with social media platforms and negotiate fair compensation data that is used to create or train software like translation engines, content recommendation algorithms, or be remixed into new media.

== Challenges ==
=== Cost ===
One challenge that data cooperatives are faced with is the overhead cost required to establish and maintain the cooperative. As a data infrastructure, data cooperatives need a substantial financial investment in order to support and maintain the IT infrastructural capabilities necessary for a data cooperative.

=== Regulations and policies ===
Current policies and regulations regarding privacy, data reuse and deletion, data interoperability, and portability enable a select group of stakeholders to dominate data ownership. The challenge here is that in order for these regulations and policies to change (specifically in a way that enables the lasting success of a data cooperative), the people who have the power to do so will first have to understand and agree that data cooperatives are appropriate and beneficial.
