= Coates (supercomputer) =

Supercomputer installed at Purdue University in 2009

Coates is a supercomputer installed at Purdue University on July 21, 2009. The high-performance computing cluster is operated by Information Technology at Purdue (ITaP), the university's central information technology organization. ITaP also operates clusters named Steele built in 2008, Rossmann built in 2010, and Hansen and Carter built in 2011. Coates was the largest campus supercomputer in the Big Ten outside a national center when built. It was the first native 10 Gigabit Ethernet (10GigE) cluster to be ranked in the TOP500 and placed 102nd on the June 2010 list.

== Hardware ==
The Coates cluster consists of 982 64-bit, 8-core HP Proliant DL165 G5p and 11 64-bit, 16-core HP Proliant DL585 G5 systems using AMD 2380 and AMD 8380 processors with various combinations of 16-128 gigabytes of RAM, 500 GB to 2 terabytes of disk and 10 Gigabit Ethernet (10GigE) local to each node. Coates uses Cisco and Chelsio network equipment. The cluster's nodes are arrayed in five logical sub-clusters each with different memory and storage configurations designed to meet the varying needs of the researchers using Coates.

== Software ==
Coates nodes run Red Hat Enterprise Linux 5.6 (RHEL5.6) and use Portable Batch System Professional 10.4.6 (PBSPro 10.4.6) for resource and job management. The cluster also has compilers and scientific programming libraries installed.

== Cooling system ==
Coates has a heat-exchanging cooling system that recycles the hot water for use on the Purdue campus.

== Construction ==
Coates was largely built in less than four hours on July 21, 2009, by a team of more than 200 Purdue computer technicians and volunteers, including volunteers from Indiana University, the University of Iowa, the University of Michigan and Michigan State University. It was the second such "high-tech barn raising" hosted by Purdue to assemble a cluster in a single morning. The process was first used for the Steele cluster in 2008.

== Funding ==
The Coates supercomputer and Purdue's other clusters are part of the Purdue Community Cluster Program, a partnership between ITaP and Purdue faculty. In Purdue's program, a "community" cluster is funded by hardware money from grants, faculty startup packages, institutional funds and other sources. ITaP's Rosen Center for Advanced Computing administers the community clusters and provides user support. Each faculty partner always has ready access to the capacity he or she purchases and potentially to more computing power when the nodes of other investors are idle.

== Users ==
The Purdue departments and schools by which Coates is used vary broadly, including Aeronautics and Astronautics, Agronomy, Biology, Chemical Engineering, Chemistry, Civil Engineering, Communications, Computer Science, Earth and Atmospheric Sciences, Electrical and Computer Engineering, Electrical and Computer Engineering Technology, Industrial Engineering, Mechanical Engineering, Medicinal Chemistry and Molecular Pharmacology, Physics, the Purdue Terrestrial Observatory and Statistics.

== DiaGrid ==
Unused, or opportunistic, cycles from Coates are made available to the TeraGrid and the Open Science Grid using Condor software. Coates is part of Purdue's distributed computing Condor flock, which is the largest publicly disclosed distributed computing system in the world and the center of DiaGrid, a nearly 43,000-processor Condor-powered distributed computing network for research involving Purdue and partners at nine other campuses.

== Naming ==
The Coates cluster is named for Clarence L. "Ben" Coates, who came to Purdue in 1973 to head the School of Electrical Engineering (now Electrical and Computer Engineering) where, for the next decade, he emphasized computer education and the development of computing facilities. He was a driving force behind the high-performance computing and networking plan that led to the creation of the Engineering Computer Network (ECN) serving all of Purdue's engineering schools. He also initiated a degree program in computer engineering at Purdue. As a research scientist at the General Electric Research Laboratory in New York, Coates developed five patents involving waveform recognition devices, circuit gates and accumulators on computer chips. The Coates cluster continues Purdue's practice of naming new supercomputers after notable figures in the university's computing history.
