= E-research =

Information technology used to support existing and new forms of research

The term e-Research (alternately spelled eResearch) refers to the use of information technology to support existing and new forms of research. This extends cyber-infrastructure practices established in STEM fields such as e-Science to cover other all research areas, including HASS fields such as digital humanities.

== Principles ==
Research data lifecycle

Practices in e-Research typically aim to improve efficiency, interconnectedness and scalability across the full research data lifecycle: collection, storage, analysis, visualisation and sharing of data.

E-Research therefore involves collaboration of researchers (often in a multi-disciplinary team), with data scientists and computer scientists, data stewards and digital librarians, and significant information and communication technology infrastructure.

In addition to human resources, it often requires the physical infrastructure for data-intensive activities, often using high performance computing systems such as grid computing.

== Applications ==
Examples of e-Research problems range across disciplines which include:

- Modelling of ecosystems or economies
- Exploration of human genome structures
- Studies of large linguistic corpora
- Integrated social policy analyses

== In Australia ==
Specialist services, centres or programmes instituted to support Australian data and technology intensive research operate under the umbrella term: eResearch. In March 2012, representatives from these eResearch groups came together to discuss the need build a "collaborative program to strengthen eResearch and address issues facing the sector nationally". The Australian eResearch Organisation (AeRO) emerged from this forum as "a collaborative organisation of national and state-based research organisations to advance eResearch implementation and innovation in Australia". Professionals working in Australian eResearch annually convene a conference known as: eResearch Australasia.

== See also ==
- Berkeley Open Infrastructure for Network Computing (BOINC)
- e-Science
