= Open Science Grid Consortium =

Distributed computing organization

The Open Science Grid Consortium is an organization that administers a worldwide grid of technological resources called the Open Science Grid, which facilitates distributed computing for scientific research. Founded in 2004, the consortium is composed of service and resource providers, researchers from universities and national laboratories, as well as computing centers across the United States. Members independently own and manage the resources which make up the distributed facility, and consortium agreements provide the framework for technological and organizational integration.

== Use ==
The OSG is used by scientists and researchers for data analysis tasks which are too computationally intensive for a single data center or supercomputer. While most of the grid's resources are used for particle physics, research teams from disciplines like biology, chemistry, astronomy, and geographic information systems are currently using the grid to analyze data. Research using the grid's resources has been published in the Journal of Physical Chemistry.

=== Large Hadron Collider ===
The Open Science Grid was created in order to facilitate data analysis from the Large Hadron Collider, and about 70% of its 300,000 computing-hours per day are dedicated to the analysis of data from particle colliders. Once data has been collected and distributed by the LHC Computing Grid, the Open Science Grid assists physicists from institutions around the world in analysis. The grid has been designed so that resources and data are shared automatically:

It's really driven not so much by where the physicists come from, but what their interests are. Physicists will be able to submit jobs to this distributed network of centers and not worry about which center that their job is actually going to run on, because the data for their task will already be there.

— Robert Gardner, Senior Research Associate at The University of Chicago

== Architecture ==
As of 2008, the OSG comprises over 25,000 computers with over 43,000 processors, most of which are running a distribution of Linux. 72 institutions, including 42 universities, are consortium members who contribute resources to the grid. There are 90 distinct computational and storage nodes in the grid, which are distributed across the United States and Brazil.

=== Peering ===
The grid is peered with other grids, including TeraGrid, LHC Computing Grid, the European Grid Infrastructure, and the Extreme Science and Engineering Discovery Environment (XSEDE), allowing data and resources from those grids to be shared.

=== Study ===
The grid's architecture has been studied by many researchers in the fields of computer science and information systems. Research about the OSG has been published in Science and Lecture Notes in Computer Science.

== Funding ==
The consortium is funded by the Department of Energy and National Science Foundation, and has received a $30 million joint grant.
