= Dai Games =

Welsh chemist

Professor Emeritus David Edgar Games
- Born: 1938; Ynysddu, Wales
- Died: May 28, 2018 (aged 79–80); Swansea, Wales
- Citizenship: Welsh
- Education: King's College London
- Known for: Liquid chromatography-mass spectrometry
- Spouse: Marguerite Games
- Children: 2
- Awards: Martin Medal (1991); Gold Medal of the Society of Analytical Chemistry (1993); J.J.Thomson Medal (1997); A.J.Evans Medal (1999); Aston Medal (1999)
- Scientific career
- Fields: Mass spectrometry, Chromatography, Chemistry
- Workplaces: Swansea University, Cardiff University, McMaster University

Director of Mass Spectrometry Research Unit
- In office 1986–2003
- Preceded by: John H. Beynon
- Succeeded by: A. Gareth Brenton

Director of EPSRC UK National Mass Spectrometry Facility
- In office 1986–2003
- Preceded by: James A Ballantine
- Succeeded by: A. Gareth Brenton

David Edgar Games (1938 – 28 May 2018) was a Welsh chemist best known for his work in mass spectrometry and chromatography.

== Early life and education ==
Dai grew up in Ynysddu in South Wales and attended the Lewis School, Pengam.

== Career and research ==
Dai graduated from King's College London, where he also obtained his PhD. After postdoctoral work at McMaster University, Hamilton, he moved to University of Wales Cardiff, where he progressed to a personal chair. In 1989 he moved to Swansea as Head of the Mass Spectrometry Research Unit at University of Wales, Swansea. Although best known as a mass spectrometrist and separation scientist who was the first person to bring liquid chromatography-mass spectrometry to Europe, he has made considerable contributions in organic chemistry research and served as Head of the Chemistry Department at Swansea.

== Awards and honours ==
In 1987, he was awarded the Royal Society of Chemistry medal for Analytical Separations and in 1991, was awarded the Martin Medal by the Chromatographic Society. In 1993 he received the Gold Medal of the Society of Analytical Chemistry. The International Mass Spectrometry Society awarded him the J.J.Thomson Medal in 1997, and in 1999 he received the A.J.Evans Medal from Cardiff University.

He was a past Chairman of the BMSS, served on the SERC Chemistry Committee as Chairman of the Instrumentation Panel and also on NERC, MRC and AFRC panels. He was a former Joint Editor-in-Chief of Biomedical and Environmental Mass Spectrometry.
