= Richard Evershed =

Richard P. Evershed
- Citizenship: British
- Occupation: Professor of Biogeochemistry

Academic background
- Education: Nottingham Trent University
- Thesis: (1981)

Academic work
- Discipline: Biogeochemistry
- Sub-discipline: Archaeological chemistry
- Institutions: Bristol University
- Website: http://www.bris.ac.uk/chemistry/people/richard-p-evershed/overview.html

Richard Evershed is a Professor of Biogeochemistry and Fellow of the Royal Society.

== Education and career ==
Evershed attended St Ivo School, St Ives in the late 1960s and graduated in 1978 from Nottingham Trent University (Trent Polytechnic, Nottingham) with a BSc in Applied Chemistry. He undertook his PhD in the Department of Chemistry at the University of Keele, investigating pheromones in social insects. Following his PhD he worked as a postdoctoral researcher in the Organic Geochemistry Unit in the School of Chemistry, University of Bristol, where he worked with Professor Geoffrey Eglinton and Professor James Maxwell to develop GC/MS and HPLC methodologies to investigate porphyrins in crude oils and source rocks. He moved to the Department of Chemistry, University of Liverpool in 1984 to manage a biochemical mass spectrometry unit, before taking up a position as Lecturer in the School of Chemistry, University of Bristol, in 1993. He was promoted to Reader in 1996, and a Chair of Biochemistry in 2000.

He is currently the Director of the Bristol Biogeochemistry Research Centre, and the Bristol node of the NERC Life Sciences Mass Spectrometry Facility. He was elected a Fellow of the Royal Society in 2010.

== Research ==
Evershed's research is highly interdisciplinary. He applies the principles and techniques of organic and analytical chemistry, to address questions spanning archaeological chemistry and palaeontology to biogeochemistry. These diverse areas are linked by his overarching interests in the preservation, recycling, decay and transport processes that impact biological materials once they enter the geosphere.

He pioneered several methodologies to analyse archaeological materials and provide ‘chemical fingerprints’, for example the method of lipid residue analysis in archaeological pottery. He has also developed techniques for comparing and distinguishing between food signatures and possible environmental contamination. His research has had a significant impact on our understanding of human activity in the past, opening new avenues for the identification of plant and animal exploitation in the past. These methods have contributed to our understanding of the origins of dairying, and provided evidence for the earliest use of beeswax, for example. Other areas his research has focused on includes stable isotope applications for studying ancient diet and agriculture, the study of marker compounds in ancient soils, and the analysis of ancient tars, resins and embalming agents. His palaeontological research has applied a similar approach to fossils, to develop a better understanding of the processes involved in the diagenesis of fossil and sub fossil organisms.

In biogeochemistry his research has focused on understanding the fate of soil organic matter. His research has developed biomolecular and isotopic methods to characterise soil organic matter and to understand how soil organisms impact the cycling of organic matter. The wider aim of this research is to produce better models for nutrient cycles, which are central to understanding the effects of global warming and intensive agriculture. This study of organic matter has also been applied to palaeoenvironment and palaeoclimatic reconstruction, using sedimentary archives such as ocean sediments and peat bogs.

One of his areas of research involves the relationships between prehistoric milk use and the evolution of lactase persistence. His research suggests that milk was being processed in pots in Europe in the 7th millennium BC, well before the lactase persistence allele became common there. Evershed was awarded a European Research Council Advanced Grant (2013–2018) for Neo-Milk, The Milking Revolution in Temperate Neolithic Europe, which investigated where, when and why dairying arose in temperate Neolithic Europe.

== Awards ==
Evershed was awarded the Royal Society of Chemistry’s Interdisciplinary Award in 2003, and the Aston Medal of the British Mass Spectrometry Society in 2010. In 2016, he was the winner of the Royal Society of Chemistry's Robert Boyle Prize for Analytical Science. In 2002, he was awarded the Royal Society of Chemistry Theophilus Redwood Lectureship. Evershed and the Organic Chemistry Unit at the University of Bristol received the Pomerance Award for Scientific Contributions to Archaeology in 2026.

== Selected publications ==
- With Nicola Temple he wrote Sorting the beef from the bull a book on the science of food fraud forensics.
- Lloyd, C, Michaelides, K, Chadwick, D, Dungait, J & Evershed, R, 2011, "Tracing the flow-driven vertical transport of livestock-derived organic matter through soil using biomarkers". Organic Geochemistry, pp. 56 – 66
- Styring, A, Sealy, J & Evershed, R, 2010, "Resolving the bulk δ15N values of ancient human and animal bone collagen via compound-specific nitrogen isotope analysis of constituent amino acids". Geochimica et Cosmochimica Acta, vol 74., pp. 241 – 251
- Outram, A, Stear, N, Bendrey, R, Olsen, S, Kasparov, A, Zaibert, V, Thorpe, N & Evershed, R, 2009, Earliest horse harnessing and milking. Science, vol 323., pp. 1332 – 1335
- Bull, I, Berstan, R, Vass, A & Evershed, R, 2009, "Identification of a disinterred grave by molecular and stable isotope analysis*. Science and Justice, vol 49., pp. 142 – 149
