= Albert Gillis von Baumhauer =

Dutch aviation pioneer (1891–1939)

Albert Gillis von Baumhauer (Heerenveen, October 1891 – Alder, State of Washington, 18 March 1939) was a Dutch aviation pioneer notable for his design of the first Dutch helicopter and the related inventions, in particular the cyclic and collective control, and a single rotor design.

== Early years ==
In 1910, Von Baumhauer built a biplane glider along with the Six brothers. In 1913, he built a model of a helicopter with two counter-rotating rotors. The helicopter flew, but it was not stable enough.

After having completed studies in Delft, Von Baumhauer studied aerodynamics for some time at Göttingen, and then went to study at the Technical University of Zürich. There, he met professor Theodore von Kármán and mathematician and aviation expert, professor Ludwig Prandtl.

In 1910, Baumhauer joined Spyker car factory, and in 1919 he became chief engineer at Van Berkel, where he was responsible for the development of the Van Berkel W-B, a seaplane for the Dutch Naval Air Service. On 12 May 1919, he married Johanna Hildegonda Oldenhuis Gratama, with whom he had three children.

After closure of the aircraft division of Van Berkel in 1921, von Baumhauer joined the National Research Centre for Aviation where he was a deputy director for some time. Here he devoted himself to various fields of aviation, especially safety in the air, both in wind tunnel tests and in scientific studies.

== Manned helicopter flight ==
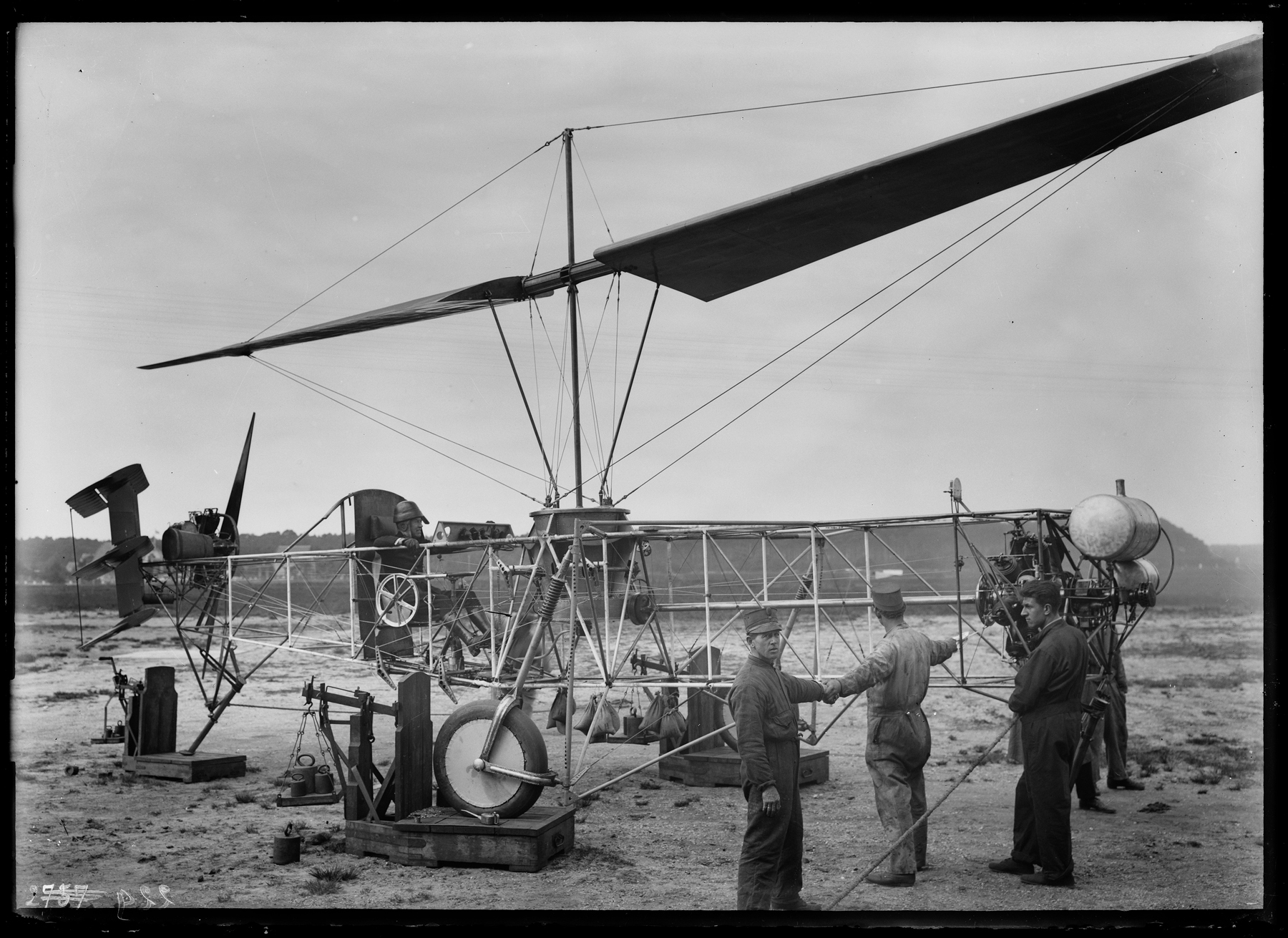

In 1924, the British Ministry of Aviation announced a contest for the construction of a helicopter, which contained several severe requirements for that time, such as flying a closed circuit with a flight speed of 100 km/h, vertical take-off and climb to up to 600 m, and glide and safe landing with a stopped engine. The prize of £50,000 attracted many contenders, with end data of May 25, 1925, which was later extended by one year. Von Baumhauer went straight to work and enrolled in 1924. On 5 November 1924, he founded, together with one of the brothers Six, the First Dutch Helicopter Aviation, in order to accomplish construction and perform the flights. The helicopter was ready in April 1925, and the first flight was made in September 1925 by Lt. F.H. van Heyst in Soesterberg. On 10 February 1926, Van Heyst managed to keep the machine several metres off the ground for 5 minutes.

After the first test flights, the helicopter was transferred to Schiphol in 1926, where B. Grass and later Peter J. Six acted as test pilots. The British contest had been cancelled due to a fatal accident in England, but von Baumhauer continued the experiments until 1930. Several improvements were made, with the flights also getting better, although they often still had a somewhat indefinite direction. On 28 August 1930, von Baumhauer himself made a half-hour flight. The next day, a hinge bolt of one of the rotor blades failed due to a fatigue crack, and the helicopter fell to the ground. The helicopter was completely destroyed, but von Baumhauer was unharmed. Since the money had almost run out, the machine was not rebuilt, but Von Baumhauer's interest in helicopter development continued until the end of his life.

Von Baumhauer's design made some major achievements which greatly influenced further development of helicopters. It used a single rotor, as opposed to two counter-rotating rotors on which most contemporary designs were based. He was one of the first to use the tail rotor to counteract the torque produced by the main rotor. The tail rotor was powered by its own engine (for easier control) and its angle of incidence could not be adjusted during flight. Another notable achievement was use of collective and cyclic pitch control. The swashplate principle was applied. Below the rotor, two concentric rings were mounted, connected to each other with bearings. The non-rotating inner ring could be tilted and moved along the rotor shaft. The outer ring rotated with the rotor and adjusted blade angles via rods. This enabled adjustment of blade pitch according to the blade's current angle, a mechanism which is still used in modern helicopters.

== Other work in aviation ==
In 1937, von Baumhauer was appointed an engineer at the Civil Aviation Administration of the Ministry of Public Works, where his tasks included testing and inspection of new aircraft types. In March 1939, he went on a study trip to the United States, where he was killed in the accident with the prototype of the four-engine Boeing 307 Stratoliner airliner in Alder, Washington state. At the time of his death, nomination was ready for his appointment as professor at TU Delft. He also found widespread recognition abroad, and was appointed as a Fellow of the Royal Aeronautical Society, corresponding member of the Deutsche Akademie für Luftfahrtwissenschaften, and representative of the Netherlands for the Daniel Guggenheim Fund (USA), responsible for aviation safety.

== See also ==
- Helicopter rotor - parts and function
- Helicopter history - first flights
- Paul Cornu
- Juan de la Cierva
- Boeing Stratoliner - Accidents and incidents
