= BMSS Medal =

Awarded by British Mass Spectrometry Society
- Established: 2002
- Country: United Kingdom
- Eligibility: Open to academic and industrial scientists of any nationality who have worked in the UK.
- Criteria: Sustained contributions by individual members of the British Mass Spectrometry Society to the promotion and advancement of mass spectrometry, primarily within the UK.
- Status: Currently constituted
- BMSS Chair: Neil Oldham

The BMSS Medal is awarded by the British Mass Spectrometry Society to individuals who have worked in the United Kingdom and have made sustained contributions by individual members of the British Mass Spectrometry Society to the promotion and advancement of mass spectrometry, primarily within the UK.

== Details ==
The award is a very occasional award, with no more than one medal being awarded each year. Recipients of this honour receive a gold-plated medal as well as an award certificate.

== Recipients ==
- Edward Houghton
- Anthony Mallet
- John J. Monaghan
- Frank S Pullen
- Gareth Brenton
- Alison Ashcroft
- John G. Langley
- Michael Morris

== See also ==
- List of chemistry awards
