= Keith R. Jennings =

British chemist (1932–2025)

- Born: 5 December 1932
- Died: 18 February 2025 (aged 92)
- Education: The Queen's College, Oxford
- Known for: Mass Spectrometry; Collision-induced dissociation
- Scientific career
- Fields: Chemist
- Workplaces: University of Warwick; University of Sheffield
- Doctoral advisor: John Wilfrid Linnett

Keith Robert Jennings (5 December 1932 – 18 February 2025) was a British chemist known for his contributions to mass spectrometry.

Jennings died on 18 February 2025, at the age of 92.

== Early life and education ==
- 1956 Ph.D. Queen’s College Oxford

== Research interests ==
- Structural studies on proteins of significant biological interest

== Awards ==
- 1985 Thomson Medal for International Service to Mass Spectrometry
- 1995 Distinguished Contribution in Mass Spectrometry Award
- 1998 Aston Medal awarded by the British Mass Spectrometry Society
- 1998 Field and Franklin Award for Outstanding Achievement in Mass Spectrometry
