= Joshua Coon =

American chemist

Joshua J. Coon
- Born: Mount Pleasant, Michigan
- Education: Central Michigan University; University of Florida
- Known for: Mass spectrometry Electron-transfer dissociation
- Scientific career
- Fields: Chemist
- Workplaces: University of Virginia; University of Wisconsin-Madison
- Academic advisors: Donald Hunt
- Website: http://coonlabs.com/

External videos
- “Joshua Coon on the Importance of Orbitrap Technology to GC-MS“, Chromatography & Mass Spectrometry Solutions, 2015
- “Here and Now: Prof Coon Stem Cells”, PBS, September 16, 2011

Joshua Coon is a professor of chemistry and biomolecular chemistry and the inaugural holder of the Thomas and Margaret Pyle Chair at the University of Wisconsin–Madison, and an affiliate of the Morgridge Institute for Research.

Coon develops scientific instruments to measure molecules in living systems. He focuses specifically on the use of mass spectrometry to measure the molecular mass of biomolecules, and its application to proteomics. Joshua Coon, along with John Syka, developed electron-transfer dissociation (ETD) while working as a postdoctoral student in Donald Hunt's lab at the University of Virginia.

== Early life and education ==
Coon was born in Mount Pleasant, Michigan. He earned his B.Sc. from Central Michigan University in 1998, and received his Ph.D. from the University of Florida in 2002, where he worked with Willard Harrison.

== Career ==
Coon was a postdoctoral student in Donald Hunt's lab at the University of Virginia from 2002 to 2005. There Joshua Coon and John Syka developed electron-transfer dissociation (ETD).

In 2005, Coon joined the University of Wisconsin-Madison. He became an associate professor in 2010, and a professor in 2012.

== Research interests ==
- Mass spectrometry
- Electron-transfer dissociation
- Proteomics
- Quantitative proteomics and Isobaric labeling

== Awards ==
- 2018, Discovery in Proteomic Sciences Award from the Human Proteome Organization (HUPO).
- 2012, Biemann Medal, for work on electron-transfer dissociation (ETD)
- 2010, Pittsburgh Conference Achievement Award
- 2009, Ken Standing Award, University of Manitoba
- 2008, National Science Foundation CAREER Award
- 2007, American Society of Mass Spectrometry Research Award for “significant achievement in basic or applied mass spectrometry made by an individual early in his or her career”
- 2007, Beckman Young Investigators Award
- 2007, Eli Lilly and Company Young Investigator Award
- 2006, One of "Tomorrow's PIs" chosen by Genome Technology magazine
