= Hansa-Brandenburg W.19 =

German fighter-reconnaissance aircraft of World War I

W.19
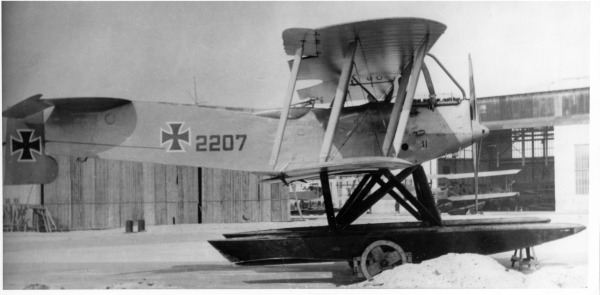

General information
- Type: Fighter-reconnaissance seaplane
- Manufacturer: Hansa und Brandenburgische Flugzeug-Werke
- Designer: Ernst Heinkel
- Primary user: Germany
- Number built: 55

History
- Introduction date: 1918
- Retired: 1918

The Hansa-Brandenburg W.19 was a German fighter-reconnaissance aircraft of World War I. It was a single-engined two-seat biplane floatplane, and was a larger development of the successful W.12. It served with the Kaiserliche Marine (Imperial German Navy) during 1918.

== Development and design ==
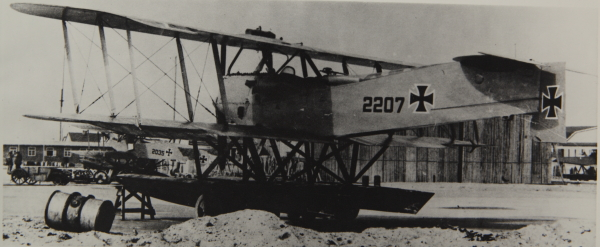
Hansa-Brandenburg W.19 prototype

Operational experience with the W.12 showed that, while it was an extremely successful design - showing excellent performance and manoeuvrability - there was a requirement for a floatplane fighter with greater endurance. To meet this requirement, Ernst Heinkel, chief designer of the Hansa und Brandenburgische Flugzeug-Werke, designed the W.19.

The W.19 was of similar layout to the W.12, but considerably larger (i.e. with a 2.6 m/8.5 ft greater wingspan and a 1 m/3.3 ft greater length). It was a single-engined tractor biplane, with two-bay wings. The aircraft was fitted with a similar inverted tailplane to the W.12 in order to give unobstructed fields of fire to the observer, who was seated in a rear cockpit, immediately behind the pilot. In order to compensate for the increased size and weight over the W.12, the W.19 was fitted with a more powerful Maybach Mb.IV engine.

Production aircraft were armed with one or two synchronised 7.92 mm (.312 in) LMG 08/15 machine guns firing forward and a single 7.92 mm LMG 08/15 machine gun for the observer. One aircraft was fitted with a 20 mm Becker cannon for tests.

== Operational history ==
The W.19 entered service with the German Navy in January 1918, operating from bases at Borkum and Zeebrugge for operations over the North Sea. It was used in support of the smaller W.19 or W.29 fighters, often scouting ahead for targets while the smaller aircraft waited on the sea. Combats often occurred between the various Hansa-Brandenburg fighters and large British flying boats such as Felixstowe F.2s and Curtiss Americas.

The W.19 continued in service until the Armistice, 55 being produced. While it had been planned to supplement it with the W.33 monoplane, only a few had been delivered by the time the war ended.

== Operators ==
German Empire

- Kaiserliche Marine

== Specifications (W.19) ==
Data from German Aircraft of the First World War

General characteristics

- Crew: 2
- Length: 10.65 m (34 ft 11 in)
- Wingspan: 13.8 m (45 ft 3 in)
- Height: 4.1 m (13 ft 5 in)
- Wing area: 57.8 m^{2} (622 sq ft)
- Empty weight: 1,435 kg (3,164 lb)
- Gross weight: 2,005 kg (4,420 lb)
- Powerplant: 1 × Maybach Mb.IV 6-cylinder water-cooled in-line piston engine, 190 kW (250 hp)
- Propellers: 2-bladed fixed-pitch propeller

Performance

- Maximum speed: 151 km/h (94 mph, 82 kn)
- Endurance: 5 hours
- Time to altitude: 1,000 m (3,300 ft) 6 minutes 24 seconds
- Wing loading: 34.7 kg/m^{2} (7.1 lb/sq ft)
- Power/mass: 0.097 kW/kg (0.059 hp/lb)

Armament

- Guns: * 2 × fixed, forward-firing 7.92 mm (0.312 in) LMG 08/15 machine guns
- 1 × flexible 7.92 mm (0.312 in) Parabellum MG14 in rear cockpit

== See also ==
Related development

- Hansa-Brandenburg W.12
- Hansa-Brandenburg W.29
- Hansa-Brandenburg W.33

Related lists

- List of seaplanes and flying boats
- List of military aircraft of Germany

== Bibliography ==
- Gray, Peter & Thetford, Owen (1987) [1970]. German Aircraft of the First World War (2nd ed.). Putnam. ISBN 0-85177-809-7.
- Green, William & Swanborough, Gordon (2001) [1994]. The Complete Book of Fighters: An Illustrated Encyclopedia of Every Fighter Built and Flown (Revised and Updated ed.). Salamander Books. ISBN 1-84065-269-1.
- Owers, Colin A. (2015). Hansa-Brandenburg Aircraft of WWI: Volume 2–Biplane Seaplanes. Great War Aviation Centennial Series. Vol. 18. Aeronaut Books. ISBN 978-1-935881-32-2.
