= Benjamin A. Garcia =

American chemist (born 1976)

Benjamin Garcia
- Born: May 19, 1976 (age 50); Los Angeles County, California
- Education: University of Virginia; University of California, Davis
- Awards: Biemann Medal
- Scientific career
- Fields: Proteomics
- Workplaces: Washington University in St. Louis; University of Pennsylvania; Princeton University
- Thesis: Proteomic Applications of Tandem Mass Spectrometry (2005)
- Doctoral advisor: Donald Hunt
- Other academic advisors: Neil Kelleher

Benjamin Aaron Garcia (born May 19, 1976) is an American chemist and Professor at the Washington University School of Medicine. His research interests revolve around developing novel mass spectrometry methods to analyze post-translational modifications of proteins and epigenetics. His work has resulted in over 250 publications and he has been recognized with numerous honors including the American Society for Mass Spectrometry Biemann Medal in 2018.

Raised in La Mirada, California, Garcia received his BS in Chemistry from University of California, Davis in 2000 and his PhD from the University of Virginia in 2005 where he worked with Donald Hunt. His doctoral thesis was entitled Proteomic Applications of Tandem Mass Spectrometry. After postdoctoral work with Neil Kelleher, he was appointed as an assistant professor at Princeton University where he worked until his appointment at the Perelman School of Medicine in 2012. In 2016, he was promoted to full Professor.
