= Gareth Brenton =

Welsh physicist and chemist

Professor Emeritus A. Gareth Brenton
- Education: University of Wales Swansea
- Known for: Mass-analyzed ion kinetic-energy spectrometry
- Awards: Curt Brunnée Award (1994); BMSS Medal (2016)

Director of Mass Spectrometry Research Unit
- In office 2013–2016
- Preceded by: Dai Games

Director of EPSRC UK National Mass Spectrometry Facility
- In office 2013–2016
- Preceded by: Dai Games
- Succeeded by: Steven L. Kelly

24th Chair of the Executive Committee, British Mass Spectrometry Society
- In office 2002–2004
- Preceded by: Frank Pullen
- Succeeded by: Mira Doig
- Scientific career
- Fields: Mass Spectrometry, physics
- Workplaces: Swansea University
- Thesis: Total scattering cross-sections of atoms in collisions with low-energy positrons (1979)
- Notable students: Carol V. Robinson

A. Gareth Brenton FLSW. is a Welsh physicist and chemist known for his work in mass spectrometry.

== Early life and education ==
Gareth was born in South Wales. He went on to attend the University of Wales at Swansea (now Swansea University) in the early 1970s. He received a Ph.D. in physics in 1979.

== Career and research ==
Gareth took a position as Professor of Mass Spectrometry in Swansea University in 1982. He was Director of the Institute of Mass Spectrometry and Director of the EPSRC National Mass Spectrometry Facility at Swansea University until 2016.

== Awards and honours ==
Gareth won the International Mass Spectrometry Society Curt Brunnée Award in 1994, and the BMSS Medal in 'Recognition of outstanding and sustained contributions to the British Mass Spectrometry Society in the promotion of Mass Spectrometry' in 2016. He was editor of Rapid Communications in Mass Spectrometry. Gareth was BMSS chairman between 2002 and 2004

In 2012, Gareth was elected a Fellow of the Learned Society of Wales.

== Key publications ==
- Beynon, J. H., and A. G. Brenton. An Introduction to Mass Spectrometry / by J.H. Beynon and A.G. Brenton. Cardiff: U of Wales, 1982. Print.
