= Mass spectrometry at Swansea =

Swansea University has had a long established history of development and innovation in mass spectrometry and chromatography.

== Mass Spectrometry Research Unit ==
In 1975, John H. Beynon was appointed the Royal Society Research Professor and established the Mass Spectrometry Research Unit at Swansea University (at that time known as the University College of Swansea). In 1986, Dai Games moved from Cardiff University to become the Units new Director.

Director of Mass Spectrometry Research Unit
1975–1986	1986–2003	2003–2016
John Beynon	Dai Games	Garteh Brenton

In 1984, the first observation of He_{2}^{2+} was made at the unit, its the same as molecular hydrogen (isolectronic molecules) except it has lots more energy 3310 kJ per mole.

== National Mass Spectrometry Service ==
A grant of £670,000 was awarded in 1985 by the then Science and Engineering Research Council (SERC) to establish a national Mass Spectrometry Center at Swansea University to provide an analytical service to British Universities. It was officially opened in April 1987 by Lord Callaghan. In 2002, the center was enlarged and the new laboratories were opened by Lord Morgan. Following successful £3,000,000 contract renewal Edwina Hart, the Minister for Economy, Science and Transport, officially re-opened the EPSRC National Research Facility after refurbishment in 2015.

Director EPSRC National Mass Spectrometry Service
1986–1998	1998–2003	2003–2016	2016–2018
James A Ballantine	Dai Games	Gareth Brenton	Steven Kelly

Manager of EPSRC National Mass Spectrometry Service
1998–2011	2011–2018
Bridget Stein	Christopher Williams

== Biomolecular Analysis Mass Spectrometry ==
A Biomolecular Analysis Mass Spectrometry (BAMS) facility was officially opened in 2003, headed by Professor Newton and Dr Dudley. It was a collaborative entity between the Department of Biological Sciences and the Medical School. It focused on the study of nucleosides, nucleotides and cyclic nucleotides.

== Stable isotope mass spectrometry ==
Stable isotope mass spectrometry is conducted in the Department of Geography, and was recently used by the Landmark Trust to determine very precisely the age of the timber from Llwyn Celyn farmhouse to the year 1420.
