= Brian Green (chemist) =

English mass spectrometrist

Brian Noel Green OBE (25 December 1933 – 17 December 2021) was an English mass spectrometrist. He developed mass spectroscopy techniques for identifying of variants in human haemoglobin. He was awarded the Aston Medal by the British Mass Spectrometry Society in 1996, and was only the third person to receive the medal.

== Early life and career ==
Green was born in Urmston, Manchester, UK on Christmas Day 1933, the eldest of three boys. His father was a draughtsman at Metropolitan Vickers, and passed on an interest in electronics to his son. He attended Manchester Grammar School and in 1955 graduated from Manchester University. Green had a long career at Metropolitan-Vickers before moving to VG MICROMASS in 1972.

A focus of Green's had been the use of mass spectrometry in the analysis of proteins, particularly haemoglobin and related molecules. He developed mass spectroscopy techniques for identifying of variants in human haemoglobin, identifying about 220 different variants. In 2021 green published a book, The Analysis of Human Haemoglobin Variants Using Mass Spectrometry. He was an author on 140 publications.

== Honours and awards ==
In 1985, Green was awarded the Order of the British Empire for contributions to mass spectrometry, and in 1996, the British Mass Spectrometry Society awarded him the Aston Medal. The medal is awarded to "persons who have made outstanding contributions to mass spectruometry". It had previously been awarded only twice, to Professor Alan Maccoll and to Professor John Beynon.

== Legacy ==
In Green's honour, the British Mass Spectrometry Society now presents the B. N. Green Prize to an early career scientist with the best flash oral presentation at their annual meeting.

== Notable works ==
- Ferrige, A.G., Seddon, M.J., Green, B.N., Jarvis, S.A., Skilling, J. and Staunton, J. (1992), Disentangling electrospray spectra with maximum entropy. Rapid Commun. Mass Spectrom., 6: 707-711. https://doi.org/10.1002/rcm.1290061115
- The Analysis of Human Haemoglobin Variants Using Mass Spectrometry Micromass UK Ltd: Wilmslow (2021 ISBN 978-1-5262-0895-8)
