= Van Berkel =

Van Berkel is a Dutch toponymic surname indicating an origin in either Berkel, South Holland, Berkel, North Brabant, or a former hamlet now part of Horst, Limburg. The Berkel is also a river in Gelderland and North Rhine-Westphalia. A variant spelling is Van Berckel. Notable people with the surname include:

- Ben van Berkel (born 1957), Dutch architect
  - Van Berkel en Bos Architectenbureau
- Crescendo van Berkel (b. 1992), Dutch footballer
- Esther van Berkel (b. 1990), Dutch volleyball player
- Gary J. Van Berkel (b. c. 1960), American chemist
- Jan van Berkel (b. 1986), Swiss/Dutch triathlete, brother of Martina
- Klaas van Berkel (b. 1953), Dutch historian of science
- Martina van Berkel (b. 1989), Swiss/Dutch swimmer, sister of Jan
- Nathalie van Berkel (born 1982), Dutch politician
- Tim Van Berkel (b. 1984), Australian triathlete
- Wilhelmus van Berkel (1869–1952), Dutch inventor of the Berkel meat slicer and aircraft manufacturer
  - Van Berkel W-A, 1920s fighter floatplane
  - Van Berkel W-B, 1920s long range reconnaissance seaplane

Van Berckel

- Engelbert François van Berckel (1726–1796), Dutch politician
- Nol van Berckel (1890–1973), Dutch footballer and judge
- Pieter Johan van Berckel (1725–1800), Dutch mayor of Rotterdam and first Dutch ambassador to the United States of America
