= Biemann Medal =

Annual award of the ASMS

The Biemann Medal is awarded annually by the American Society for Mass Spectrometry (ASMS) to an individual early in their career in recognition of significant achievement in basic or applied mass spectrometry. It is named after professor Klaus Biemann.

Nominees must be within the first 15 years of receiving the Ph.D. in the year nomination is considered (exceptions may be considered). Eligibility is not restricted to members of ASMS.

The award is conferred at the ASMS Annual Conference with the presentation of a $5,000 cash award, the Biemann Medal, and the award lecture.

== Recipients ==
- 1997 – Scott A. McLuckey
- 1998 – Robert R. Squires
- 1999 – Matthias Mann
- 2000 – Julie A. Leary
- 2001 – Peter B. Armentrout
- 2002 – Ruedi Aebersold
- 2003 – Carol V. Robinson
- 2004 – John R. Yates
- 2005 – Gary J. Van Berkel
- 2006 – David E. Clemmer
- 2007 – Roman A. Zubarev
- 2008 – Julia Laskin
- 2009 – Neil L. Kelleher
- 2010 – David C. Muddiman
- 2011 – Bela Paizs
- 2012 – Joshua J. Coon
- 2013 – Yinsheng Wang
- 2014 – Lingjun Li
- 2015 – Michael MacCoss
- 2016 – Kristina Håkansson
- 2017 – Ryan Julian
- 2018 – Benjamin A. Garcia
- 2019 – Sarah Trimpin
- 2020 – Ying Ge
- 2021 – Nuno Bandeira
- 2022 – Erin S. Baker
- 2023 – Brandon T. Ruotolo
- 2024 – Gary Patti
- 2025 – Livia S. Eberlin
- 2026 – Nikolai Slavov

== See also ==
- List of chemistry awards
- List of female mass spectrometrists
