= Mira Doig =

British chemist

- Education: University of London
- Known for: Mass Spectrometry
- Scientific career
- Fields: Chemist
- Workplaces: MC Analytical

25th Chair of the Executive Committee, British Mass Spectrometry Society
- In office 2004–2006
- Preceded by: Gareth Brenton
- Succeeded by: Don Daley

Mira Victoria Doig is a British biochemist and analytical chemist known for her contributions to mass spectrometry.

After attending Sittingbourne Girls Grammar School, Doig completed her undergraduate degree in biochemistry at the University of London. In 1981, she completed her doctoral studies in analytical chemistry.

Doig worked in industry starting at Glaxo Wellcome before moving to ABS Laboratories in 1996. Since 2023, she has worked at Bioapp Solutions, and as the Chief Scientific Officer for MC Analytical.

Doig was chair of the British Mass Spectrometry Society from 2004 to 2006. She was awarded life membership by the Society for her contributions to mass spectrometry.
