= Norderney =

- Town
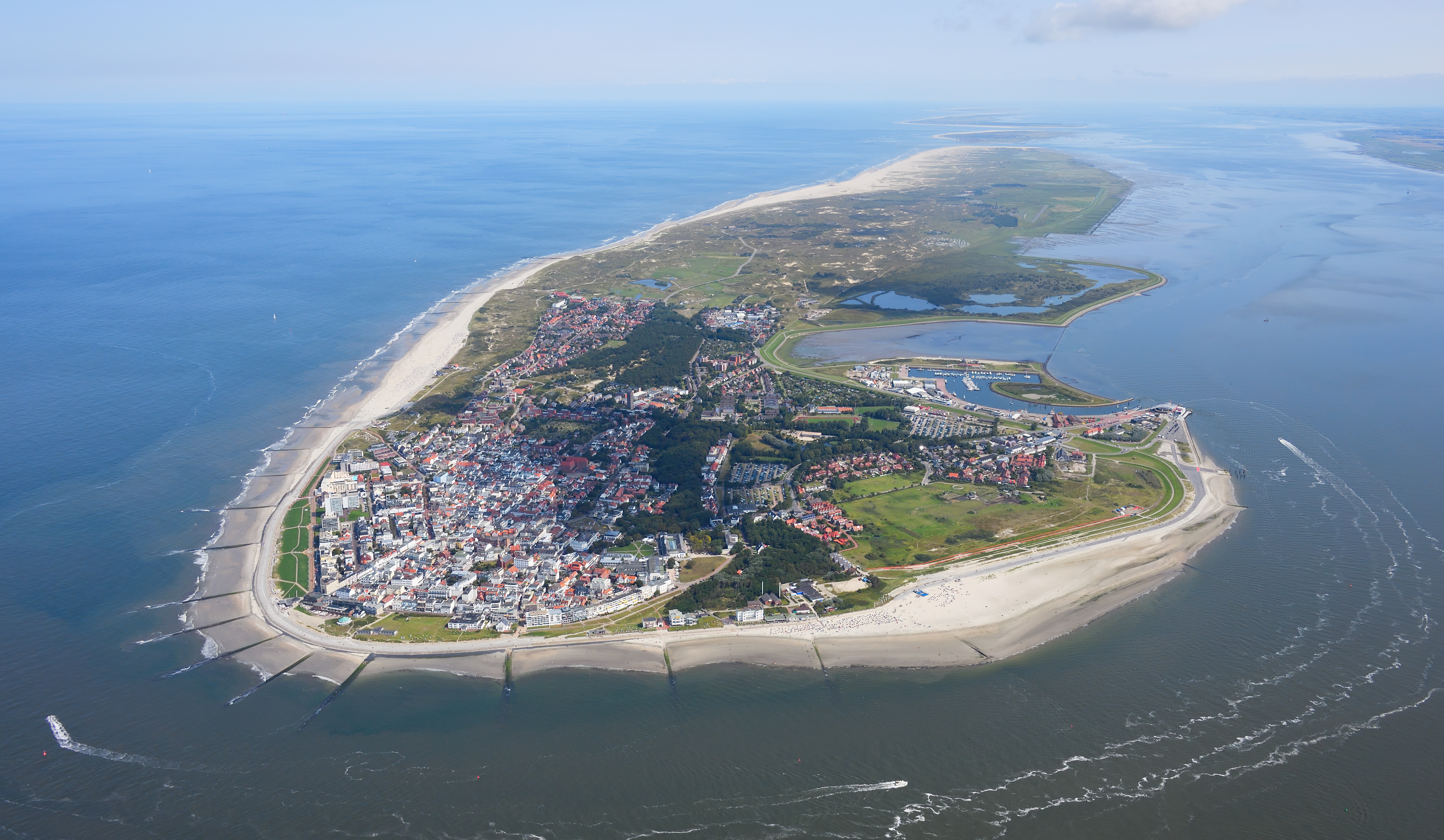
- Aerial view of Norderney from the west

- Flag Coat of arms

- Location of Norderney within Aurich district
- Interactive map of Norderney
- Location within Germany Location within Lower Saxony
- Coordinates: 53°42′26″N 07°08′49″E
- Country: Germany
- State: Lower Saxony
- District: Aurich
- Subdivisions: 2 Ortsteile Fischerhafen, Nordhelmsiedlung

Government
  - Mayor (2019–24): Frank Ulrichs

Area
  - Total: 26.31 km^{2} (10.16 sq mi)
- Elevation: 5 m (16 ft)

Population (2025-12-31)
  - Total: 5,358
  - Density: 203.6/km^{2} (527.4/sq mi)
- Time zone: UTC+01:00 (CET)
  - Summer (DST): UTC+02:00 (CEST)
- Postal codes: 26548
- Dialling codes: 04932
- Vehicle registration: AUR, NOR
- Website: www.norderney.de

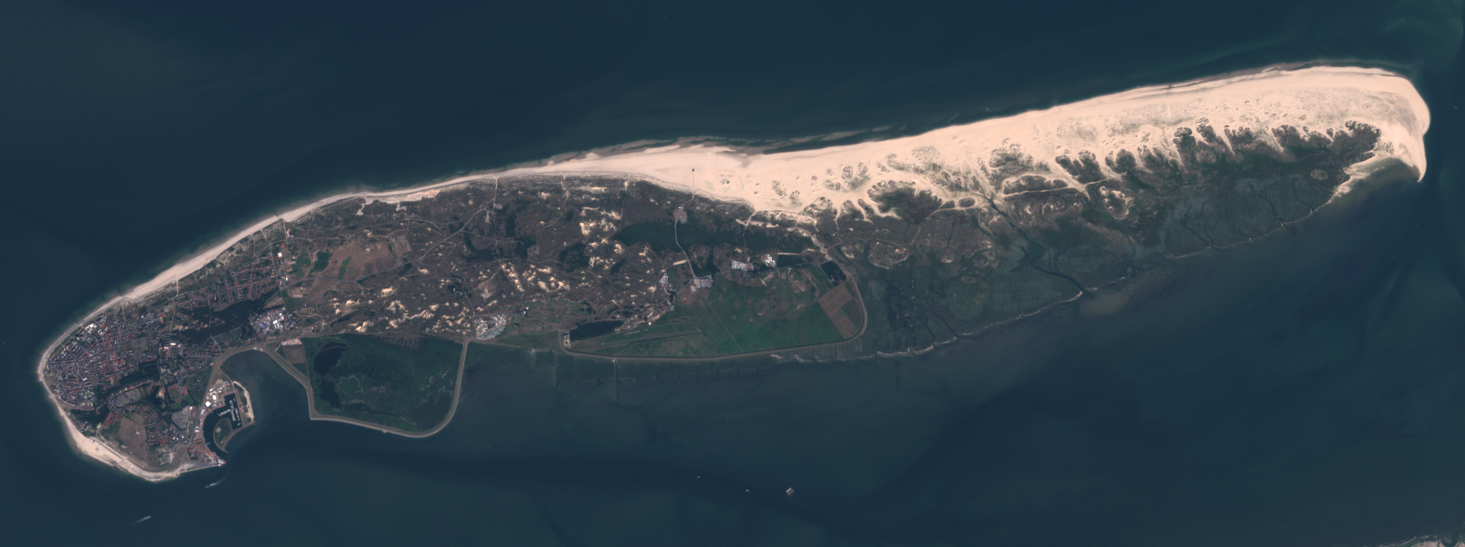
Norderney as seen from space

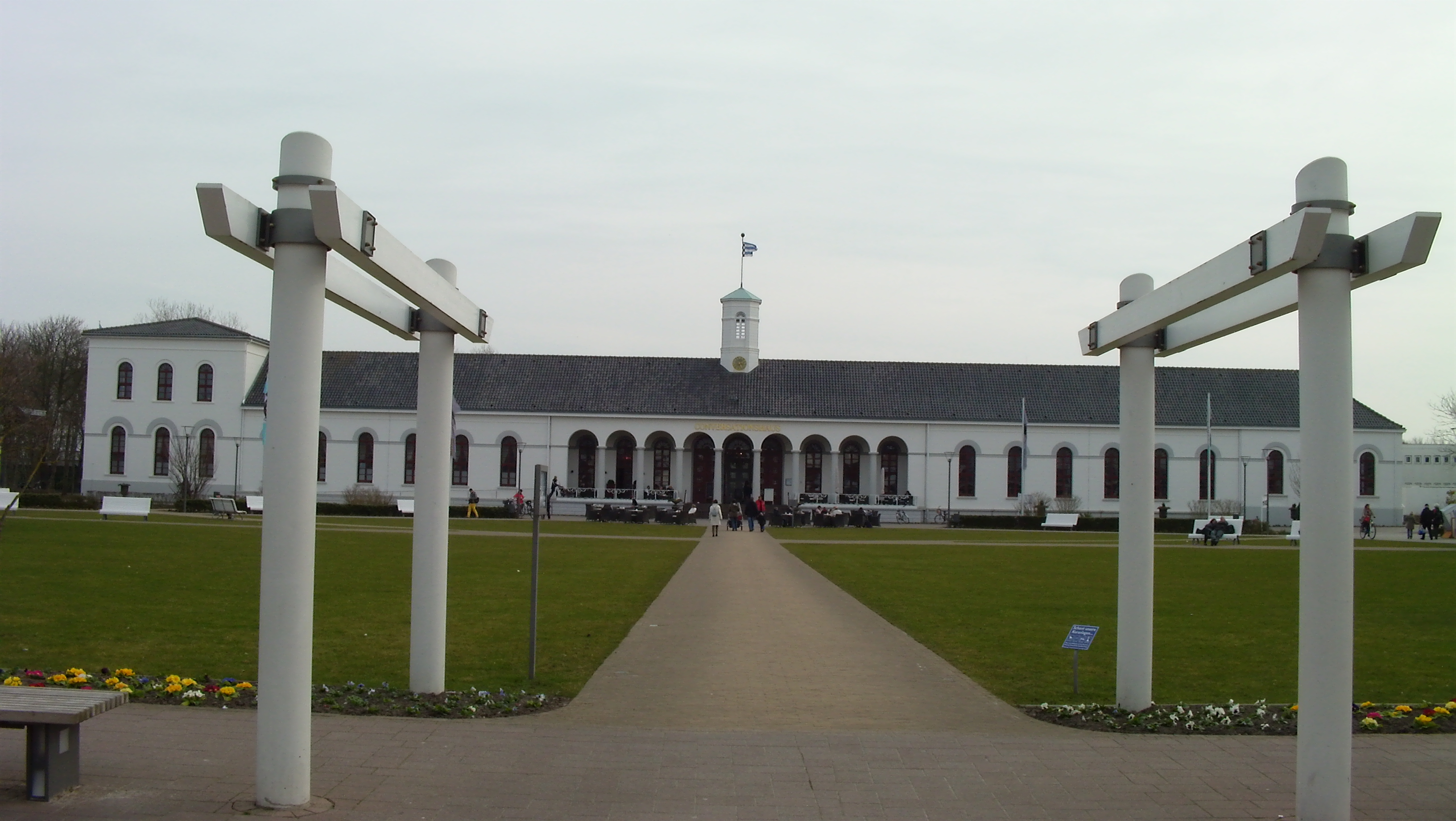
The Conversationshaus (2010)

Norderney (German pronunciation: [ˌnɔʁdɐˈnaɪ]; Low German: Nördernee) is one of the seven populated East Frisian Islands off the North Sea coast of Germany.

The island is 14 by 2.5 kilometres (8.7 by 1.6 mi), having a total area of about 26.3 square kilometres (10.2 sq mi) and is therefore Germany's ninth-largest island. Norderney's population amounts to about 5,850 people. In 1946 Norderney gained municipal status and belongs to the Aurich "Kreis" (county). On the northern side of the island lies a 14-kilometre (8.7 mi) long sandy beach.

The neighbouring island to the east is Baltrum, which lies about 800m (half a mile) away beyond the Wichter Ee. To the west is the island of Juist, about 3 kilometres (1.9 mi) away on the other side of the Norderneyer Seegatt.

The entire eastern half of Norderney belongs to the Lower Saxon Wadden Sea National Park. Access to the park is restricted, as it is subdivided into zones of different accessibility for the protection of the wildlife. The status as a National Park also affects all types of traffic on the island, while especially car traffic is subject to strict regulations.

The mainland is easily reached via ferry operated by AG Reederei Norden-Frisia from the harbour, Norddeich pier near the northern German city of Norden. Norderney also possesses an airport with a 1,000-metre (3,300 ft) runway.

== History ==
Of the seven East Frisian islands, Norderney is the youngest. The island has existed in its present form only since the middle of the 16th century, being the eastern remnant of the larger island Buise. The original Buise was split into two parts during the Grote Mandrenke flood of 1362, the eastern remnant at first being called Ostrende. What was left of Buise (the western part) shrank in size over the years and finally disappeared into the North Sea during the St. Peter's Flood of 1651. Ostrende, on the other hand, grew in size, and is noted in a 1550 census as "Norder neys Oog" (Northern New Island), and having a church and 18 houses. The inhabitants at this time worked principally as fishermen. In the second half of the 18th century the sea trade industry grew in importance. Next to fishing, tourism became important to the island economy. In 1797, Norderney became the first German resort on the North Sea.

It is believed that the first durable settlements were established during the 13th and 14th centuries. A town developed in the western part of the island, protected by high dunes. The first documented mention of the island was in 1398. By 1650 the island was about 8.3 kilometres (5.2 mi) long and the town had about 18 houses and 101 inhabitants. A severe storm flooded the island at Christmastime in 1717. In the 1830s shellfish harvesting became the most important activity of the islanders.

Crown Prince Georg of Hannover, Herzog von Cumberland, visited Norderney for the first time in 1836 and from 1851 held court each summer on the island. During this time the resort gained a strong following of the rich and famous. In 1858 a 950-metre deck with promenade was built. The island's windmill was built in 1862. In 1899 the island had 4,018 inhabitants and 26,000 resort guests. In 1901 an angelfish fishery was established. In 1925 there were 5,564 inhabitants and 38,140 guests. Deutsche Luft Hansa commenced scheduled flights to the island the same year.

== Cultural references ==
- The island features in The Riddle of the Sands, the 1903 novel by Irish novelist Erskine Childers.
- The island features in Seven Gothic Tales the 1934 collection of short stories by Danish novelist Isak Dinesen.

== Coat of arms and flag ==
Since 10 July 1928, the coat of arms of the city of Norderney depicts the local landmark, the "Kap," or cape building. A dune and water are shown underneath. Such high structures helped mariners identify the island and orient themselves in earlier times. There are similar buildings on Borkum and Wangerooge. The Norderney cape building was built in 1848 from wood, and was replaced in 1870 with a stone building. At night a fire was lit in the top part of the structure. Today lighthouses have taken over this function. The island painter Poppe Folkerts designed the coat of arms.

Norderney is one of the smallest German communities to fly its own flag. The small city flag has horizontal blue and white stripes and a black and white checkered area on the left side. The blue colour stands for the sea, white symbolizes the colour of the sand, and black stands for the Norderney sea sign.

== Climate and recreation ==
Norderney has a maritime climate, with generally less extreme temperatures than on the nearby mainland. Precipitation occurs mainly during the winter and autumn, but autumn seems to be slightly wetter, with November being the wettest month with 87.6 millimetres (3.45 in) while spring tends is usually the driest time due to the still cool sea temperature, which can't produce a lot of humidity.

Summers are warm and sometimes hot, but the sea winds regulate the temperature down usually within a few days. Winters are mild and, due to the effect of the Gulf Stream, usually free of frosts. The Island also has more sunshine hours than the mainland, with around 2,000 hours per year.

Sea temperatures are fluctuating between 3 and 7 °C (37 and 45 °F) in the winter and over 20 °C (68 °F) in the summer months. The highest temperature so far was 35.4 °C (95.7 °F) on 24 July 2019 and the coldest −19.4 °C (−2.9 °F) on 11 February 1929.

Climate data for Norderney Island (1991–2020 normals). Extremes 1898 - 2026
Month	Jan	Feb	Mar	Apr	May	Jun	Jul	Aug	Sep	Oct	Nov	Dec	Year
Record high °C (°F)	12.8 (55.0)	15.3 (59.5)	21.8 (71.2)	27.3 (81.1)	30.3 (86.5)	34.1 (93.4)	35.4 (95.7)	33.7 (92.7)	30.2 (86.4)	25.5 (77.9)	17.3 (63.1)	13.0 (55.4)	35.4 (95.7)
Mean daily maximum °C (°F)	4.6 (40.3)	4.9 (40.8)	7.5 (45.5)	11.5 (52.7)	14.9 (58.8)	17.9 (64.2)	20.5 (68.9)	20.9 (69.6)	17.9 (64.2)	13.4 (56.1)	8.7 (47.7)	5.7 (42.3)	12.4 (54.3)
Daily mean °C (°F)	3.0 (37.4)	3.1 (37.6)	5.2 (41.4)	8.6 (47.5)	12.0 (53.6)	15.1 (59.2)	17.6 (63.7)	18.1 (64.6)	15.3 (59.5)	11.2 (52.2)	6.9 (44.4)	4.1 (39.4)	10 (50)
Mean daily minimum °C (°F)	1.2 (34.2)	1.3 (34.3)	3.0 (37.4)	6.1 (43.0)	9.7 (49.5)	12.8 (55.0)	15.3 (59.5)	15.6 (60.1)	13.0 (55.4)	9.0 (48.2)	5.0 (41.0)	2.3 (36.1)	7.8 (46.0)
Record low °C (°F)	−15.5 (4.1)	−19.4 (−2.9)	−13.5 (7.7)	−4.4 (24.1)	1.0 (33.8)	4.9 (40.8)	6.9 (44.4)	8.4 (47.1)	3.6 (38.5)	−4.2 (24.4)	−9.5 (14.9)	−15.5 (4.1)	−19.4 (−2.9)
Average precipitation mm (inches)	58.2 (2.29)	45.2 (1.78)	42.9 (1.69)	36.4 (1.43)	41.8 (1.65)	61.2 (2.41)	79.9 (3.15)	89.1 (3.51)	78.9 (3.11)	77.0 (3.03)	67.6 (2.66)	69.0 (2.72)	747.3 (29.42)
Average precipitation days (≥ 1.0 mm)	19.1	16.4	15.4	12.9	12.3	14.7	15.0	16.7	16.1	18.7	19.4	19.6	196.3
Average snowy days (≥ 1.0 cm)	2.6	3.6	1.2	0	0	0	0	0	0	0	0	2.3	9.7
Average relative humidity (%)	87.5	85.5	82.9	79.6	78.5	78.4	78.0	77.0	79.1	82.5	86.5	87.8	81.9
Mean monthly sunshine hours	51.0	74.2	139.1	204.1	242.3	221.1	234.1	210.3	155.3	106.4	56.9	43.8	1,727.6
Source 1: World Meteorological OrganizationDeutscher Wetterdienst
Source 2: European Climate Assessment and Dataset

There is a nudist beach just east of Norderney's popular Weiße Düne (White Dune) beach.

== See also ==
- List of ferry boats of the East Frisian Islands
- Lager Norderney – a Nazi labour camp named after the island, on Alderney in the Channel Islands.
- Norderneyer Seegatt
