= Curt Brunnée =

German physicist (1928–2023)

- Born: 24 May 1928; Rostock, Mecklenburg-Schwerin, Germany
- Died: 14 December 2023 (aged 95)
- Education: Universität Rostock, Universität Marburg
- Known for: Mass spectrometry
- Scientific career
- Fields: Mass spectrometry
- Workplaces: Atlas Werke
- Academic advisors: Wilhelm Walcher

Curt Brunnée (24 May 1928 – 14 December 2023) was a German physicist known for his contributions to the field of mass spectrometry instrumentation. Brunnée was born on 24 May 1928.

Brunnée married his long time laboratory assistant, Curta, in 1953. He died on 14 December 2023, at the age of 95.

== Career and research ==
Brunnée grew up in Rostock, his father was a dentist and his grandfather had a factory in Göttingen that produced optical instruments. During the war, his childhood home was destroyed by a bombing raid in 1942 and in 1944, the family narrowly escaped death as a bomb partially destroyed the cellar in which they were sheltering. Only after the war ended and schools resumed, could Brunnée finish his high school education and enter university. He entered the Universität Rostock in 1946, but fled in 1948 due to the increasingly repressive climate in eastern Germany, crossing the boundary between the Soviet occupation zone and the west illegally. He then enrolled at the Universität Marburg, where he obtained his degree in physics in 1952 and completed his PhD in 1955 in the laboratory of Wilhelm Walcher, who used a sector mass spectrometer for isotope separation. In 1956, he met Ludolf Jenckel (1912–1990) through his PhD advisor Walcher and joined the MAT division at Atlas Werke (a ship building company in Bremen) where Jenckel was building mass spectrometers.

The instrument the ATLAS-MAT division sold at the time (the CH3) was not competitive with the instruments from the competition (Metrovick and CEC) and thus the CH4 instrument was developed, to which Brunnée contributed. In 1970 he became the head of the whole division with 280 employees. In 1988 he was promoted to worldwide research director of the Finnigan Instrument Corporation and retired in 1991. He received the Thomson Medal from the International Mass Spectrometry Foundation (IMSF) in 1994 and the Curt Brunnée Award (IMSF) is named after him, which recognizes contributions to instrument development.
