= David C. Muddiman =

American chemist

- Known for: mass spectrometry
- Scientific career
- Fields: Analytical chemistry, mass spectrometry
- Workplaces: North Carolina State University
- Doctoral advisor: David M. Hercules
- Website: chemistry.sciences.ncsu.edu/people/dcmuddim/

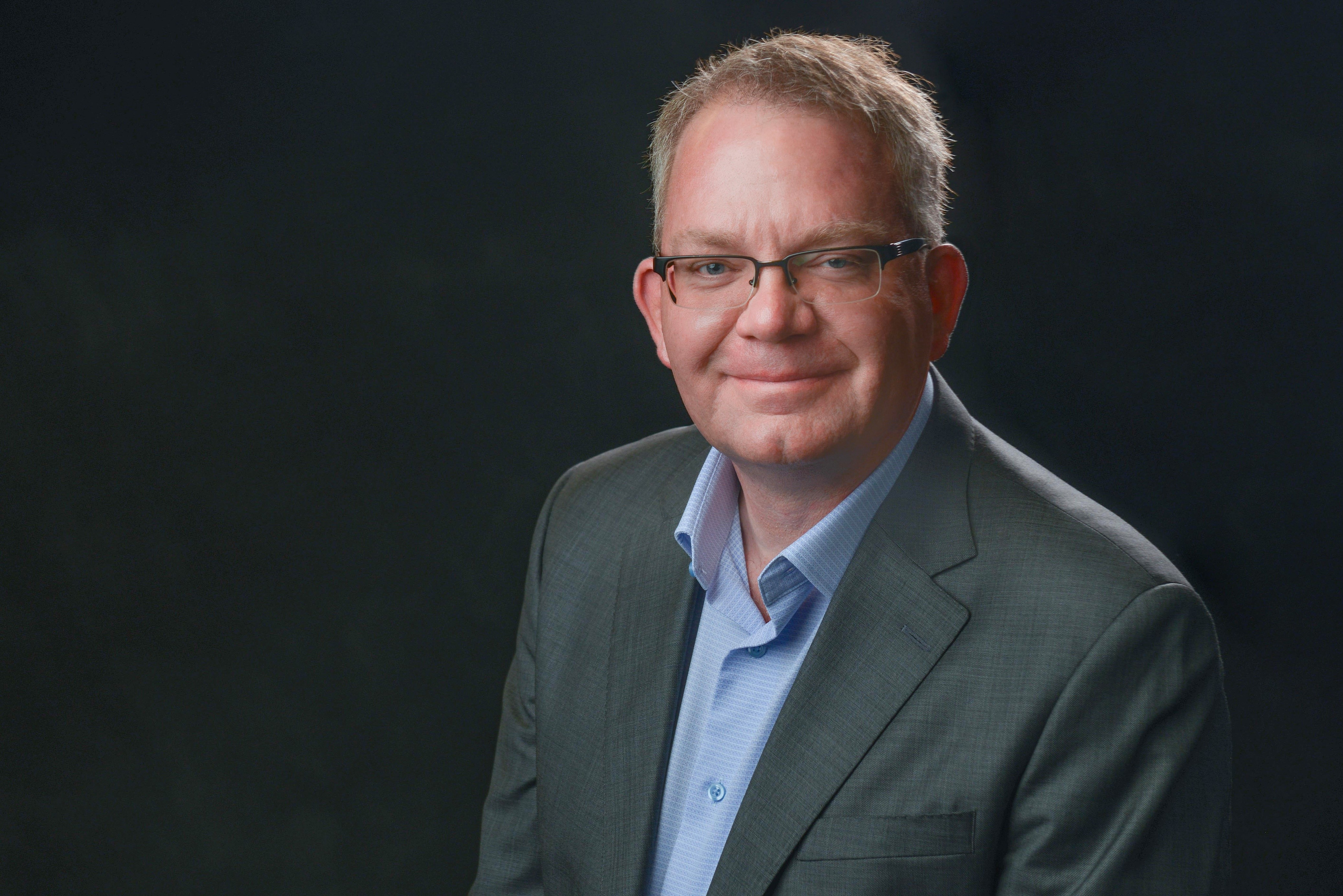
Photo of D.C. Muddiman 2025

David C. Muddiman is an American chemist and the Jacob and Betty Belin distinguished professor of chemistry at North Carolina State University in Raleigh, North Carolina. His research is focused on developing multi-omic mass spectrometry imaging (MSI) based platforms including software and innovative ionization methods.

He received his B.S. in Chemistry with a Minor in Business (1990) from Gannon University and a Ph.D. from the University of Pittsburgh in Bioanalytical Chemistry (1995) under the auspices of the late David M. Hercules, and then carried out a post-doctoral fellowship at the Pacific Northwest National Laboratory (1995–1997) under the direction of Richard D. Smith. His independent academic career prior to his appointment at NC State University were at Virginia Commonwealth University (1997–2002) and the Mayo Clinic College of Medicine (2002–2005).

In 2024 Dr. Muddiman was elected as a Fellow of the American Association for the Advancement of Science (AAAS). He is the recipient of the 2023 Donald F. Hunt Distinguished Contribution to Proteomics Award, 2016 Graduate School Outstanding Graduate Mentor Award in the Mathematical, Physical Sciences, and Engineering, 2015 ACS Award in Chemical Instrumentation, 2010 Biemann Medal (American Society for Mass Spectrometry), 2009 NCSU Alumni Outstanding Research Award, the 2004 ACS Arthur F. Findeis Award, the 1999 American Society for Mass Spectrometry Research Award, and the 1990-1991 Safford Award for Excellence in Teaching (University of Pittsburgh).

His service to the scientific community is extensive. He has served as a panel member and or chair of over 100 NIH study sections including being a charter member of EBIT, was Editor of Analytical and Biological Chemistry (2015-2020) and he is currently the Coordinating Editor of the Journal of Mass Spectrometry (2022-present), and serves on the Editorial Advisory Board of Molecular and Cellular Proteomics, Rapid Communications in Mass Spectrometry, and the Journal of Chromatography B. He also serves as the Chair of the advisory board of the NIH Funded Yale/NIDA Neuroproteomics Center, Yale University.

He has served as a member of the ASMS Board of Directors (2013-2015) as well as Treasurer (2013-2015) and President (2015-2017) of the United States Human Proteome Organization. In 2017, he took a vision for improving measurement science at NC State and was named the founding director of the molecular education, technology and research innovation center (METRIC); he held this position until 2023.
