= Ryan Julian =

American chemist

- Education: California Institute of Technology
- Scientific career
- Fields: Proteomics
- Workplaces: University of California, Riverside
- Thesis: Molecular Recognition of Biomolecules in the Gas Phase (2003)
- Doctoral advisor: J. L. Beauchamp

Ryan Julian is an American chemist and Professor at the University of California, Riverside. His research uses mass spectrometry to study proteins and protein structure. His work has resulted in over 85 publications and he has been recognized with numerous honors including the American Society for Mass Spectrometry Biemann Medal in 2017.

Julian received his BS in chemistry from the University of Utah in 1999 and his PhD from the California Institute of Technology in 2003. After postdoctoral work at Indiana University, he was appointed as an assistant professor at University of California, Riverside in 2005.
