= John J. Monaghan =

British mass spectrometrist

- Education: University of Glasgow, University of Manchester
- Awards: BMSS Medal

22st Chair of the Executive Committee, British Mass Spectrometry Society
- In office 1998–2000
- Preceded by: Alison Ashcroft
- Succeeded by: Frank Pullen

1st President, British Mass Spectrometry Society
- Incumbent
- Assumed office 2003
- Preceded by: office established
- Scientific career
- Fields: Mass Spectrometry
- Workplaces: Imperial Chemical Industries
- Doctoral advisor: Durward Cruickshank

John J. Monaghan is a British mass spectrometrist and former editor of Rapid Communications in Mass Spectrometry.

== Early life and career ==
Monaghan attended the University of Glasgow, where he completed his undergraduate degree in chemistry. He then undertook a PhD with Durward Cruickshank involving the study of gas-phase electron diffraction. After completing his studies he moved to work at Imperial Chemical Industries in Blackley site under the direction of mass spectrometrist John Beynon focusing on the analysis of textile dyestuffs. He was an early adopter and enthusiast of the Fast Atom Bombardment technique developed at the nearby UMIST by Mickey Barber and Don Sedgwick.

== Other interests ==
Monaghan is an active member of the British Mass Spectrometry Society and has been given life membership for making a significant contribution to the practice of mass spectrometry in the UK. In 2003 the BMSS made John its first President with responsibility to promote the work done by the Society, particularly on the international stage and beyond the core MS community.

Monaghan has also been a member and president of the Peterloo Speakers Club in Manchester. He is also a keen cricketer and football referee.
