= Aston Medal =

British mass spectrometry award

Awarded by British Mass Spectrometry Society
- Established: 1987
- Country: United Kingdom
- Eligibility: Open to academic and industrial scientists of any nationality who have worked in the UK.
- Criteria: Outstanding contributions to our understanding of the biological, chemical, engineering, mathematical, medical, or physical sciences relating directly to mass spectrometry.
- Status: Currently constituted
- BMSS Chair: Prof Neil Oldham

The Aston Medal is awarded by the British Mass Spectrometry Society to individuals who have worked in the United Kingdom and have made outstanding contributions to our understanding of the biological, chemical, engineering, mathematical, medical, or physical sciences relating directly to mass spectrometry. The medal is named after one of Britain's founders of mass spectrometry and 1922 Nobel prize winner Francis William Aston.

The award is made sporadically, with no more than one medal being awarded each year. Recipients of this honour receive a gold-plated medal with a portrait of Francis Aston as well as an award certificate.

== Recipients ==
- 1989 – Allan Maccoll
- 1990 – John H. Beynon
- 1996 – Brian Green
- 1998 – Keith Jennings
- 1999 – Dai Games
- 2003 – Colin Pillinger
- 2005 – Tom Preston
- 2006 – John Todd
- 2008 – Robert Bateman
- 2010 – Richard Evershed
- 2011 – Carol Robinson
- 2013 – Tony Stace
- 2017 – R. Graham Cooks
- 2023 – Alexander Makarov

== See also ==
- List of chemistry awards
