= Gary J. Van Berkel =

American chemist

- Known for: Electrospray
- Scientific career
- Fields: Chemist
- Workplaces: Oak Ridge National Laboratory

Gary J Van Berkel is a research scientist who led the Organic and Biological Mass Spectrometry Group at Oak Ridge National Laboratory until his retirement from there in 2018. He is currently the Chief Scientific Officer of Van Berkel Ventures, a scientific equipment research firm based in Oak Ridge, Tennessee.

He is best known for his research on electrochemistry of electrosprays.

== Awards ==
- 2016 R&D 100 Award "Open Port Sampling Interfaces for Mass Spectrometry"
- 2014 Battelle "Inventor of the Year"
- 2013 Oak Ridge National Laboratory "Scientist of the Year"
- 2013 Oak Ridge National Laboratory "Inventor of the Year"
- 2013 Rapid Communications in Mass Spectrometry Beynon Prize
- 2010 R&D 100 Award "Liquid Microjunction Surface Sampling Probe for Mass Spectrometry"
- 2005 Biemann Medal

== Select publications ==
- Scott A. McLuckey; G J Van Berkel; G L Glish (1 January 1992). "Tandem mass spectrometry of small, multiply charged oligonucleotides". Journal of the American Society for Mass Spectrometry. 3 (1): 60–70. doi:10.1016/1044-0305(92)85019-g. ISSN 1044-0305. PMID 24242838. Wikidata Q61784590.
- Juan Fernandez de la Mora; Gary J. Van Berkel; Christie G. Enke; Richard B. Cole; Manuel Martinez-Sanchez; John B. Fenn (1 August 2000). "Electrochemical processes in electrospray ionization mass spectrometry". Journal of Mass Spectrometry. 35 (8): 939–952. doi:10.1002/1096-9888(200008)35:8<939::aid-jms36>3.0.co;2-v. ISSN 1076-5174. PMID 10972994. Wikidata Q47587910.
- Gary J. Van Berkel; Scott A. McLuckey; Gary L. Glish (15 July 1992). "Electrochemical origin of radical cations observed in electrospray ionization mass spectra". Analytical Chemistry. 64 (14): 1586–1593. doi:10.1021/ac00038a015. ISSN 0003-2700. Wikidata Q128844537.
