= Gary Patti =

American biochemist

- Known for: Metabolomics, Mass Spectrometry
- Awards: Biemann Medal, ACS Midwest Award, Academy of Sciences Innovation Award, Mallinckrodt Scholar Award, Pew Scholars, Sloan, Camille Dreyfus Teacher-Scholar Award
- Scientific career
- Fields: Metabolism, Mass Spectrometry, Computational Biology, Cancer
- Workplaces: Washington University in St. Louis
- Website: https://www.pattilab.com/

Gary J. Patti is an American biochemist known for his research in metabolism and for using mass spectrometry to characterize biological processes. He is the Michael and Tana Powell Professor at Washington University in St. Louis. He is co-founder and Chief Scientific Officer of Panome Bio and an Associate Editor for Clinical & Translational Metabolism.

== Awards ==
- Biemann Medal, 2024
- ACS Midwest Award, 2023
- Academy of Science Innovation Award, 2016
- Edward Mallinckrodt Jr. Scholar Award, 2016
- Pew Biomedical Scholars Award, 2015
- Alfred P. Sloan Award, 2014
- Camille Dreyfus Teacher-Scholar Award, 2014
