= Klaus Biemann =

American biochemist

- Born: November 2, 1926; Innsbruck, Austria
- Died: June 2, 2016 (aged 89)
- Education: University of Innsbruck; Ph.D. Organic Chemistry 1951
- Known for: Mars Viking mass spectrometer
- Awards: Benjamin Franklin Medal in Chemistry (2007); NASA Exceptional Scientific Achievement Medal (1977)
- Scientific career
- Fields: Mass spectrometry
- Workplaces: Massachusetts Institute of Technology
- Doctoral advisor: Hermann Bretschneider
- Other academic advisors: George Büchi
- Doctoral students: John M. Hayes; Ronald A. Hites; Julie A. Leary; Jack T. Watson
- Other notable students: Post-docs: Stephen S. Hecht; Donald F. Hunt; Helmut Schwarz

Klaus Biemann (November 2, 1926 – June 2, 2016) was an Austrian-American professor of chemistry at the Massachusetts Institute of Technology. His work centered on structural analysis in organic and biochemistry. He has been called the "father of organic mass spectrometry" but was particularly noted for his role in advancing protein sequencing with tandem mass spectrometry following pioneering work conducted in this area by Michael Barber.

== Career and research ==
Biemann was born in Innsbruck, Austria in 1926. He was drafted into the Wehrmacht during the final months of World War II and was sent to aid the divisions fighting against Allied forces then retreating before the Soviet Army on the Eastern Front. Fearing capture, he deserted with a friend to travel back to Innsbruck. Following in the footsteps of his father, he studied pharmacy at the University of Innsbruck where he graduated in 1948. He received his PhD at the University of Innsbruck supervised by Hermann Bretschneider in 1951. He started his work on his habilitation, but instead moved to the MIT in 1955 to work as a postdoctoral fellow in the group of George Büchi. Two years later with the assistance of Büchi, he was offered a faculty position at MIT in the analytical chemistry division where he turned his focus to peptide analysis and sequencing. Before embarking on his new research, however, Biemann decided to buy a mass spectrometer and use it to study peptides instead. He used his background in organic chemistry to modify peptides so that they become volatile and entered the gas phase, making them amenable to electron ionization, the only feasible ionization technique at the time. He partnered on the NASA Viking mission project to Mars which failed to detect organic matter on its the surface in 1976.

== Awards and honors ==
- Stas Medal of the Belgian Chemical Society (1962)
- Fellow of the American Academy of Arts and Sciences (1966)
- Fritz Pregl Medal of the Austrian Microchemical Society (1977)
- NASA Exceptional Scientific Achievement Medal (1977)
- Guggenheim Fellow (1983)
- Field and Franklin Award in Applied Mass Spectrometry from the American Chemical Society (1986)
- ACS Analytical Chemistry Award from the American Chemical Society (2001)
- Thomson Medal from the International Mass Spectrometry Foundation (1991)
- Pehr Edman Award (1992)
- Member of the National Academy of Sciences (1993)
- Beckman-ABRF Award from the Association of Biomolecular Resource Facilities (1995)
- Benjamin Franklin Medal in Chemistry from the Franklin Institute (2007)
