= Norderneyer Seegatt =

Strait in the southern North Sea

Coordinates: 53.7044°N 7.1319°E

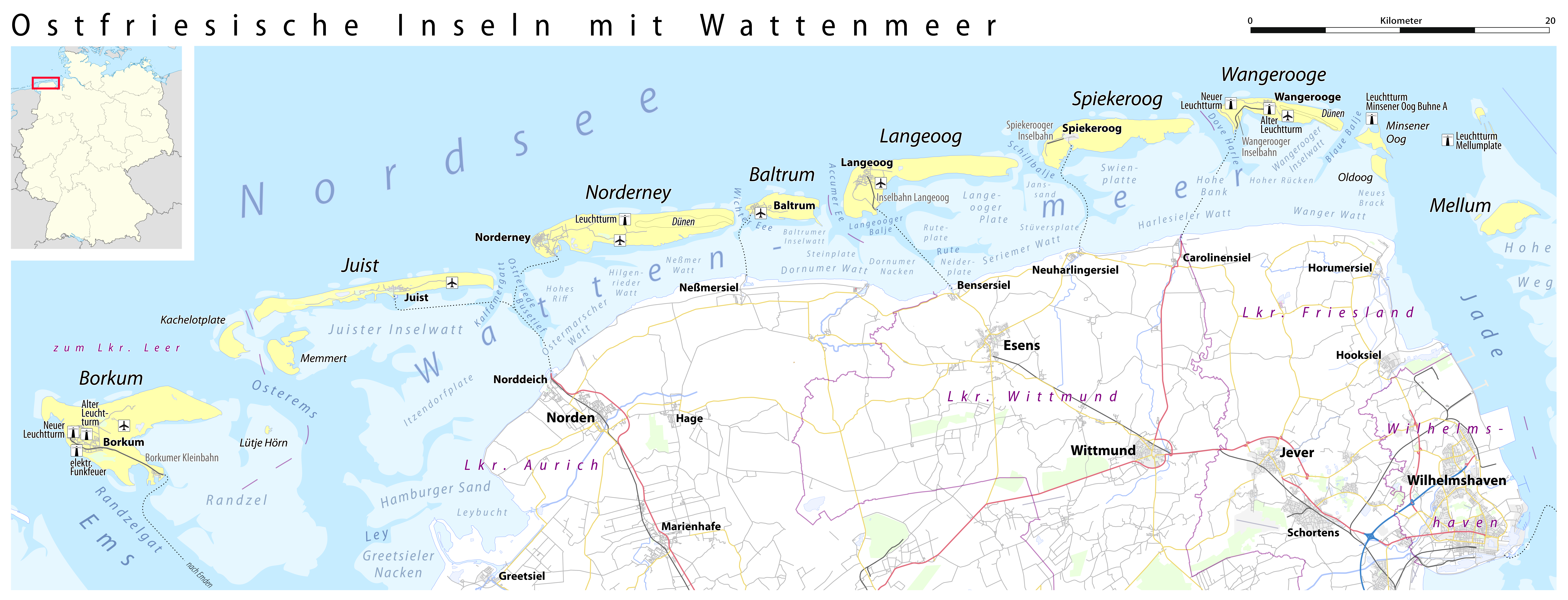
Norderneyer Seegat between the islands of Juist and Norderney

The Norderneyer Seegatt or (officially) Norderneyer Seegat is a gat in the southern North Sea.

The gat runs in a north–south direction between the East Frisian Islands of Juist to the west and Norderney to the east. There are two marked shipping channels for craft navigating from the North Sea into the Norderneyer Seegatt. From the west the gat is approached along the Schluchter and from the east the Dovetief. The Norderneyer Seegatt is subject to marked morphological changes as a result of tidal action, so that the location and depth of the channels changes continuously.
