= Jack Throck Watson =

American biochemist

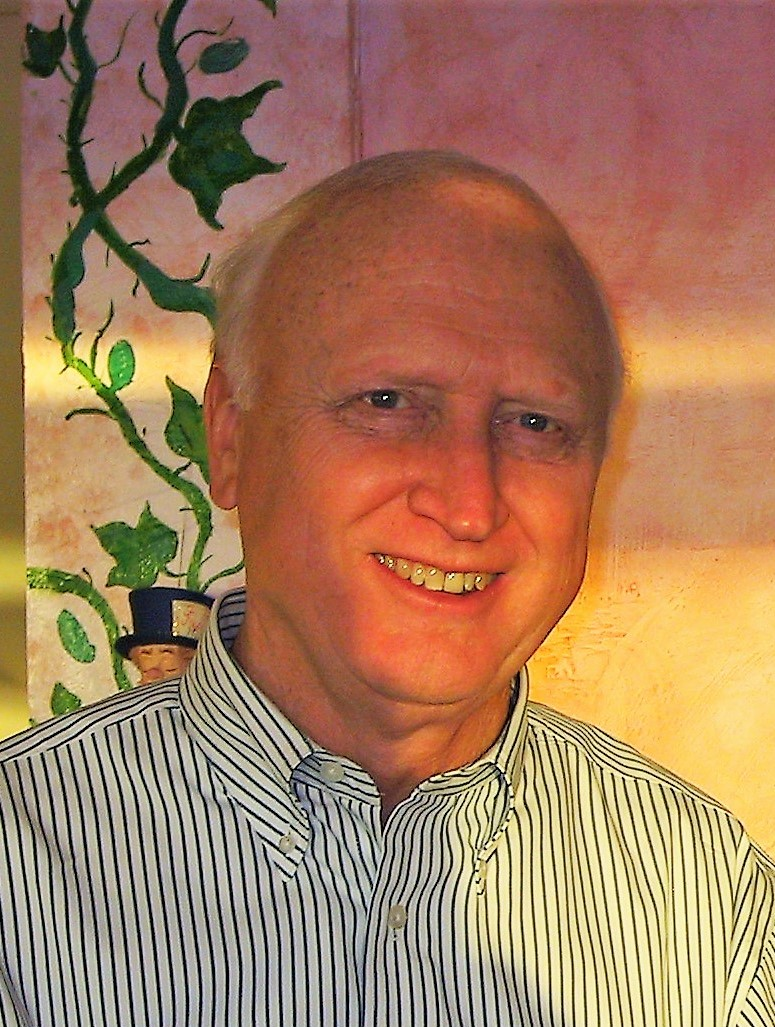
- Born: May 2, 1939; Casey, Iowa, United States
- Died: September 3, 2016 (aged 77)
- Education: Massachusetts Institute of Technology; Ph.D. Analytical chemistry 1965
- Scientific career
- Fields: Mass spectrometry
- Workplaces: Michigan State University
- Doctoral advisor: Klaus Biemann

Jack Throck Watson (May 2, 1939 – September 3, 2016) was an American biochemist who was a professor of biochemistry and chemistry at the Michigan State University, where he was also director of the MSU Mass Spectrometry Facility. While at MIT, Watson developed a gas chromatography–mass spectrometry interface, known as the Watson–Biemann separator, that removes helium from the gas chromatograph column effluent, thereby allowing analysis of less volatile and more polar compounds. Watson later worked on methods for the structure elucidation of peptides and proteins using fast atom bombardment and matrix-assisted laser desorption ionization (MALDI) mass spectrometry. After retirement in 2006, he continued to work on his introductory mass spectrometry textbook and teach short-courses in mass spectrometry.

== Early life and education ==
Jack Watson was born on May 2, 1939, in Casey, Iowa, to Jesse H. and Anne Watson. Jack grew up in a town of about 1,000 residents in northern Iowa, Nora Springs. His father was the area's school superintendent and he had one brother. After graduating from Nora Springs High School 1957, he went to Iowa State University, majoring in chemistry and taking part in the University’s Air Force ROTC program for four years which accounts for the four years he spent on active duty in California and Texas. Before serving his Air Force obligation, after graduation Iowa State with a degree in Chemical Technology in 1961, he went to graduate school at the Massachusetts Institute Technology (MIT).

At MIT, Watson was a PhD candidate in the laboratory of Klaus Biemann, one of the most notable experts in organic mass spectrometry at the time. As soon as he graduated from MIT, Watson reported for duty in the United States Air Force in the San Francisco Bay area. A friend of his from high school, introduced Watson to Judith Sjoberg. Not long after that, they were married and moved to Brooks Air Base in San Antonio, Texas.

After completing his tour of duty in the Air Force, Watson took a one-year postdoctoral position in Strasbourg France at the Institut de Chimie, Université de Strasbourg under the direction of Robert Wolf. During this time and through the licensing of the Watson-Biemann gas separator to Thomson-CSF, for use in a gas chromatograph-mass spectrometer they ware manufacturing at the time, Watson made everlasting ties to the French Mass Spectrometry community.

== Career ==
After completing his postdoctoral fellowship in France, in 1969, Watson returned the United States and held a position as an Assistant Professor in the Department of Pharmacology at Vanderbilt University, in Nashville Tennessee. Jack was promoted to Associate Professor with tenure in 1974. While at Vanderbilt, Watson published the first edition of Introduction to Mass Spectrometry: Biomedical, Environmental, and Forensic Applications in 1976. It was the first book to include journal titles as part of the cited literature.

Harold G. (Harry) Walsh had just joined the ACS as director of the Short Course program. Walsh approached Watson and asked him to teach a course. Walsh also asked that Watson select someone from the mass spectrometry industry to co-teach the course. Watson had met O. David Sparkman, an American working for the French Gas Chromatography/Mass Spectrometry company, Riber, in Paris, a few months earlier. Watson asked Sparkman to contribute to the data systems part of the course. They taught the first session at the annual Pittsburgh Conference on Analytical Chemistry and Applied Spectroscopy in the Spring of 1978. They taught the course two more times that year at the annual ACS meetings and continued teaching into the first decade of the next millennium.

In 1980 Watson accepted a joint appointment in the Departments of Biochemistry and Chemistry at Michigan State University, East Lansing Michigan. He also became the director (Principal Investigator) of the National Institutes of Health (NIH) P41 Regional Resource in Mass Spectrometry at MSU. He remained director of the NIH facility until the NIH no longer funded such facilities and retired from his teaching position in 2006. The MS Facility continued to operate after funding stopped through the efforts of Watson, the Biochemistry and Chemistry Departments.

== Personal life ==
A friend of his from high school introduced Watson to Judith Sjoberg. Not long after that, they were married and moved to Brooks Air Base in San Antonio, Texas. They had two children in Nashville, Jennifer, born in 1970, and Brent born in 1972.

== Legacy ==
A Fellowship in Watson's name has been established at Michigan State University where recipients will be graduate students in the Department of Biochemistry and Molecular Biology.This is the “Jack Throck Watson Graduate Fellowship in Biochemistry Endowment.”
