= Alan Quayle =

British chemist and mass spectrometrist

Alan Quayle was a British chemist and mass spectrometrist.

== Career ==
During the 1950s, Quayle worked at the research laboratories of the Shell Refining & Marketing Co. Ltd at the Thornton Research Centre. Quayle spent time working at the Shell oil refinery in Deer Park, Texas laboratory with Jack O'Neill in the USA, where he also attended meetings of the ASTM Committee E-14 at the Pittsburgh Analytical Conference. Much of his early work involved the development of "high molecular weight" analysis up to m/z 800 using the MS2 with a heated inlet. He later worked at Aston University in its Department of Molecular Sciences.

Quayle was a founding member of the British Mass Spectrometry Society and its 3rd Chair during 1966–67. He was also a key member of the Hydrocarbon Research Group of the Institute of Petroleum. He was the first editor of the International Journal of Mass Spectrometry.

== Personal life ==
Alan Quayle was born on 28 July 1923 in Middlesbrough, the only child of John Quayle, an elementary teacher, and Mary Elizabeth (née Emery). He married Thelma Marie Lindop in Chester in 1952. They had two sons: Andrew John and William Duncan (who died aged 18). Alan Quayle died on 2 January 1994 in Mollington, Cheshire; he was survived by his wife, son and two grandsons. Thelma died on 5 March 2010.
