= Yinsheng Wang =

Chemist

- Education: Washington University in St. Louis
- Known for: Mass Spectrometry
- Awards: American Society for Mass Spectrometry 2013 Biemann Medal
- Scientific career
- Fields: Chemistry
- Workplaces: University of California Riverside
- Website: https://sites.lsa.umich.edu/hakansson-lab/

Yinsheng Wang is a Professor of Chemistry and the Director for the ETOX (Environmental Toxicology) Graduate Program at the University of California Riverside. His current research involves the use of a multi-pronged approach encompassing mass spectrometry, synthetic chemistry, and molecular biology, for understanding the biological consequences of DNA damage and the molecular mechanisms of actions of anti-cancer drugs and environmental toxicants.

He obtained his B.S., M.S., and Ph.D. in Chemistry from Shandong University (1993), Dalian Institute of Chemical Physics (1996), and Washington University in St. Louis (2001), respectively. He joined the faculty of the University of California Riverside in 2001.

He has received several awards including a Research Award (2005) and the Biemann Medal (2013) from the American Society for Mass Spectrometry, and the inaugural Chemical Research in Toxicology Young Investigator Award (2012), cosponsored by the Division of Chemical Toxicology of the American Chemical Society and the ACS journal Chemical Research in Toxicology. He is also a fellow for the American Association for the Advancement of Sciences (since 2012).
