= Van Berkel W-B =

W-B
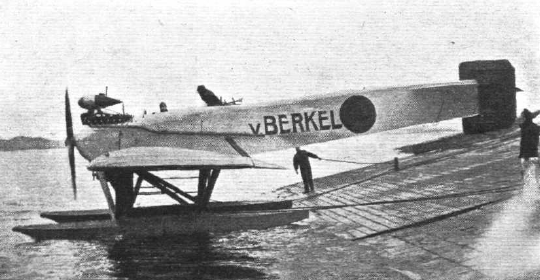
- On the slipway at de Kok

General information
- Type: Long range reconnaissance sea plane
- National origin: Nederlands
- Manufacturer: Van Berkel's Patent Company Ltd, Rotterdam
- Designer: Von Baumhauer
- Primary user: Dutch Naval Aviation Service (MLD)
- Number built: 7

History
- Introduction date: 1920/1
- Retired: 1933
- Developed from: Hansa-Brandenburg W.29

The Van Berkel W-B was a single engine Dutch long range reconnaissance seaplane built in the early 1920s for work in the Dutch East Indies. Six were operated by the Dutch Naval Aviation Service (MLD) with disappointing results, though the last two were not decommissioned until 1933.

== Design and development ==
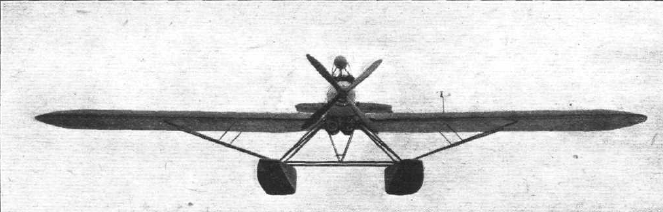
W-B head on

As neutrals in World War I, the Dutch armed forces experienced difficulties in obtaining military aircraft from abroad. To ease the problems of both the Dutch Army Aviation Group (LVA) and the MLD, in August 1917 the Ministry of War encouraged companies like the car makers Spyker to become involved in aircraft production. The only other manufacturer to volunteer was Van Berkel's Patent Company Ltd, formed to make meat processing cutters. They began by building the Hansa-Brandenburg W.12 floatplane fighter under licence as the Van Berkel W-A, then in 1919 the MLD invited to company to design and build a long range reconnaissance floatplane for use in the Dutch East Indies, based on the Hansa-Brandenburg W.29. The resulting Van Berkel W-B was broadly similar to the W.29 but both larger and more powerful: its span was increased by more than 40% and it had a 360 hp rather than a 150 hp engine.

The W-B was a braced low-wing monoplane with wings of constant chord. These were braced from below with pairs of parallel steel tube lift struts on each side, assisted by small jury struts, connecting the wing to the top of the appropriate float. Each float was mounted on the fuselage lower longerons by basically N-form struts, the leading member doubled into a narrow V, sharing common junctions with both the wing struts and two horizontal cross braces between the floats. Two more V-form struts linked the centres of the cross members vertically upwards to the lower fuselage. The floats, with rounded noses, three steps and vertical stern posts were made of aluminium alloy since wood degraded rapidly in tropical waters.

The fuselage was of simple, rectangular cross section. The 270 kW (360 hp) Rolls-Royce Eagle VIII water-cooled V-12 engine was installed in the nose with its upper cylinders exposed and a long external exhaust down the fuselage starboard side. Underneath the nose there were two "lobster pot" style Lamblin radiators. The pilot sat in an open cockpit just aft of the engine, with a second cockpit for the gunner some way behind. The fuselage remained deep and high sided back to the tail, possibly offering some directional stability in the absence of a fixed fin. The tailplane was mounted on top of the fuselage just ahead of the extreme tail, where an unusual rudder which extended both above and below the fuselage was hinged. This was one of the features that visually distinguished the W-B from the W.29, on which the rudder was entirely below the top of the fuselage.

The aviation department of Van Berkel Patent was closed in June 1921 and the proposed civilian version of the W-B, the W-F was never built.

== Operational history ==
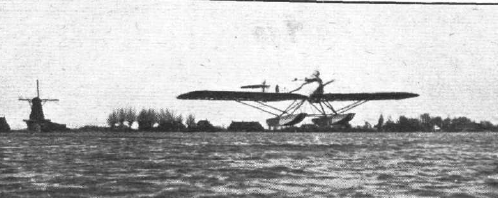
Takeoff from a lake near Rotterdam

The W-B flew for the first time on 3 September 1920. After testing, which showed that the specification parameters were met, six production aircraft were delivered to the MLD. The last went to the Priok Naval Air Station in Indonesia in December 1923. Their performance in operational conditions was disappointing, with poor flight characteristics and the first four were withdrawn from service in 1926; the last two remained in use for another seven years.

== Specifications ==
Data from Flight 13 April 1921

General characteristics

- Crew: Two
- Length: 11 m (36 ft)
- Wingspan: 20 m (64 ft)
- Height: 4.3 m (14 ft)
- Fuel capacity: 782 L (172 Imp gal; 207 US gal)
- Useful load: 950 kg (2,100 lb), of which approximately 610 kg (1,350 lb) is fuel.
- Powerplant: 1 × Rolls-Royce Eagle VIII water cooled V-12, 270 kW (360 hp)
- Propellers: 4-bladed

Performance

- Maximum speed: 180 km/h (110 mph, 97 kn) at sea level
- Range: 1,600 km (1,000 mi, 870 nmi) approximately, at cruising speed
- Endurance: 7.5 h at full throttle

Armament

- Guns: 3 machine guns, two forward firing, one on mounting in gunner's cockpit
- Bombs: "a nest"
