= Rapid Communications in Mass Spectrometry =

- Discipline: Mass Spectrometry, Science of gas-phase ions
- Language: English
- Edited by: David Goodlett, John J. Monaghan, Pierre Thibault, Dietrich Volmer

Publication details
- History: 1987-present
- Publisher: John Wiley & Sons
- Frequency: Biweekly
- Impact factor: 2.419 (2020)

Standard abbreviations
- ISO 4: Rapid Commun. Mass Spectrom.

Indexing
- CODEN: RCMSEF
- ISSN: 0951-4198 (print); 1097-0231 (web)
- LCCN: 88645064
- OCLC no.: 643958996

Links
- Journal homepage; Online access; Online archive

Rapid Communications in Mass Spectrometry (RCM) is a biweekly peer-reviewed scientific journal published since 1987 by John Wiley & Sons. It covers research on all aspects of mass spectrometry. According to the Journal Citation Reports, the journal has a 2020 impact factor of 2.419.

== RCM Beynon Prize ==
To mark the 80th birthday of John H. Beynon, the founding Editor of RCM, in 2004 an annual award was established in his honour by the publishers. The award is made on the recommendation of an ad hoc Sub-committee of the editorial board of RCM.
