= Alison Ashcroft =

British chemist

Alison E. Ashcroft
- Education: University of Liverpool, University of Manchester
- Known for: Mass Spectrometry
- Scientific career
- Fields: Chemistry, Physics, Biochemistry

21st Chair British Mass Spectrometry Society
- In office 1996–1998
- Preceded by: Tony Mallet
- Succeeded by: John J. Monaghan
- Workplaces: University of Leeds

Alison E Ashcroft is a British chemist and Emeritus Professor of Biomolecular Mass Spectrometry at the University of Leeds. Her work is focused on method development in mass spectrometry to study protein folding and protein aggregation in relation to diseases.

== Career ==
Ashcroft obtained a BSc from the University of Liverpool in 1977 and then, following a year as a research chemist at Glaxo Group Research, a MSc (1979) and PhD (1981) from the University of Manchester. Next, Ashcroft worked as a postdoctoral research fellow at the University of Geneva, Switzerland (1981–1982) before joining Kratos Analytical (1983–1988) in Manchester. She then moved to ICI Pharmaceuticals (1988–1990) followed by Micromass UK Ltd (1991–1997) before joining the University of Leeds (1997–). She was promoted to Professor of Biomolecular Mass Spectrometry in 2009 and became Emeritus Professor in 2019.

Ashcroft received the American Society for Mass Spectrometry (ASMS) Ron Hites Award for “Outstanding Research Publication in JASMS” (2009), the Harold Edwin Potts Alumni Medal Award for “Outstanding Contribution to Chemistry” from the University of Liverpool (2014), the Royal Society of Chemistry's Rita and John Cornforth Award, shared with Professor Sheena Radford, for "Integrating analyses of protein assembly mechanisms" (2015), the British Mass Spectrometry Society (BMSS) Medal for "outstanding and sustained contributions to the BMSS" (2019), and the International Mass Spectrometry Foundation (IMSF) Thomson Medal for "outstanding achievements in mass spectrometry and distinguished services to international mass spectrometry societies" (2020).
