= Hansa-Brandenburg W.12 =

German biplane fighter floatplane

W.12
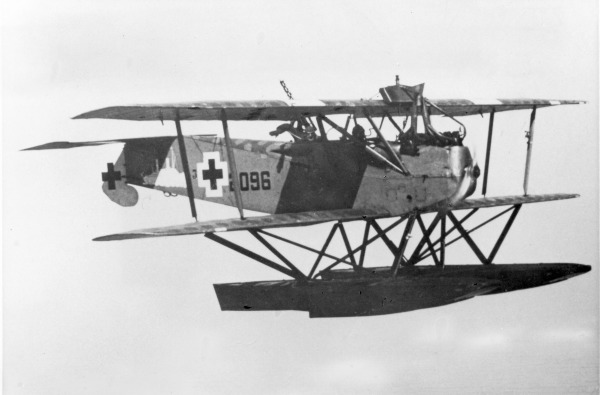
- Right-forward oblique view of a W.12 in flight

General information
- Type: Floatplane fighter
- Manufacturer: Hansa-Brandenburg
- Designer: Ernst Heinkel
- Primary users: Kaiserliche Marine Marine-Luchtvaartdienst
- Number built: 181

History
- First flight: Early 1917

The Hansa-Brandenburg W.12 was a biplane fighter floatplane built by the Hansa-Brandenburg Aircraft Company (Hansa Brandenburgische Flugzeugwerke) for the Imperial German Navy's (Kaiserliche Marine) Naval Air Service (Marine-Fliegerabteilung) during World War I. Six prototypes were ordered in 1916 and deliveries began the following year. The W.12s served on the Western Front, based at the naval air bases in Occupied Belgium and along the German Bight. The aircraft was successful, and one shot down the British airship C.27.

In 1919 the government of the Netherlands bought a licence to build the aircraft. 35 W.12s were subsequently manufactured by the Van Berkel company of Rotterdam as the W-A, serving with the Dutch Naval Aviation Service until 1934.

== Design and development ==
The W.12 was designed by the company's chief designer, Ernst Heinkel, as a two-seat biplane fighter floatplane to protect the Naval Air Service's air bases. Aviation historian Peter M. Grosz states that Heinkel may have been influenced by design work done in Austria-Hungary by companies that shared an owner with Hansa-Brandenburg, Camillo Castiglioni.

== Operational history ==
Oberleutnant Friedrich Christiansen shot down the non-rigid airship C.27 on 11 December 1917 for his fourth aerial victory.

=== Dutch service ===
After suffering an engine failure, a W.12 made an emergency landing south of Rottum Island in the Netherlands on 22 April 1918 and it was recovered by the Royal Netherlands Navy. After repairs it was flight tested by the head of the Naval Aviation Service, Luitenant ter zee der 1ste klasse D. Vreede who was impressed with its performance. It was purchased from the Imperial German Navy and became the pattern aircraft for the Van Berkel W-A after the Naval Aviation Service purchased a license for the W.12. It placed an order for 35 W-A floatplanes with industrialist Wilhelmus van Berkel on 15 November 1918 even though van Berkel lacked any experience with building aircraft. The Dutch initially planned on using 200-metric-horsepower (147 kW) Hispano engines, also built by van Berkel, but they were poorly manufactured and had to be replaced by used 180-metric-horsepower (132 kW) Mercedes D.IIIaü engines purchased in Germany. The last of the W-As were withdrawn from service in 1934.

== Variants ==
- W.12 : German Navy model. 146 built.
- Van Berkel W-A : Dutch licence-built W.12, with Mercedes D.IIIaü engine. 35 built.

== Operators ==
- German Empire
  - Kaiserliche Marine
- Netherlands
  - Dutch Naval Aviation Service

== Specifications (W.12) ==
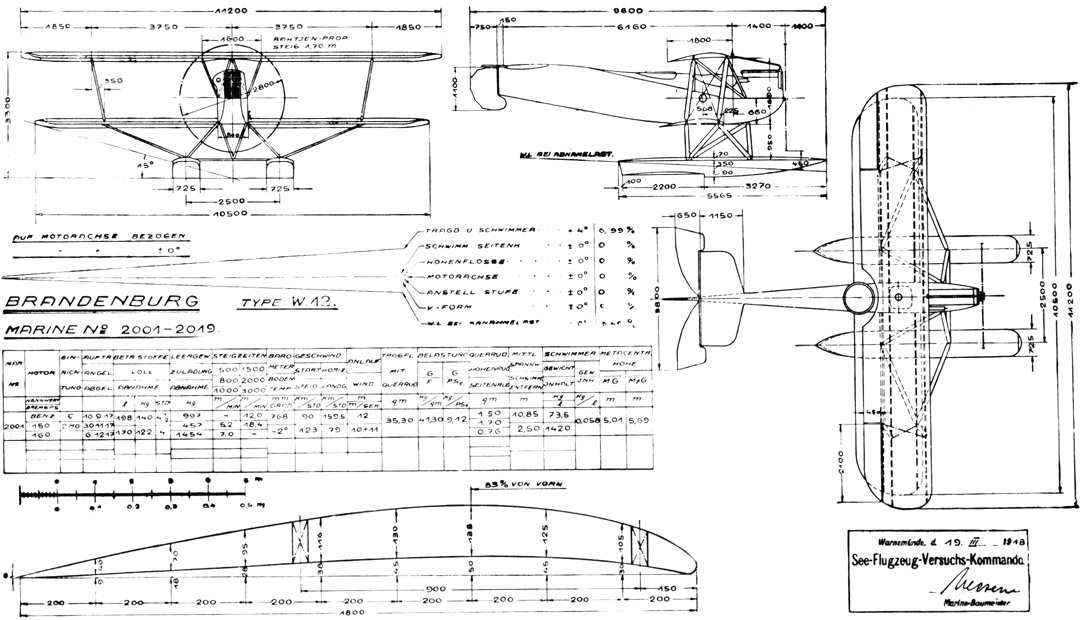
Official Baubeschreibung drawing of the W.12

Data from Hansa-Brandenburg Aircraft of WWI: Volume 2–Biplane Seaplanes; German Aircraft of the First World War

General characteristics

- Crew: 2
- Length: 9.6 m (31 ft 6 in)
- Upper wingspan: 11.2 m (36 ft 9 in)
- Lower wingspan: 10.5 m (34 ft 5 in)
- Height: 3.3 m (10 ft 10 in)
- Wing area: 36.2 m^{2} (390 sq ft)
- Empty weight: 997 kg (2,198 lb)
- Gross weight: 1,454 kg (3,206 lb)
- Powerplant: 1 × Mercedes D.III water-cooled straight-six engine, 120 kW (160 hp)
- Propellers: 2-bladed fixed-pitch

Performance

- Maximum speed: 160 km/h (99 mph, 86 kn)
- Range: 520 km (320 mi, 280 nmi)
- Endurance: 3 hours 30 minutes
- Service ceiling: 5,000 m (16,000 ft)
- Time to altitude: 7 minutes to 1,000 m (3,300 ft)
- 18.9 minutes to 2,000 m (6,600 ft)

Armament

- Guns: 1 or 2 × fixed forward-firing 7.92 mm (0.312 in) LMG 08/15 machine guns

- 1 × 7.92 mm Parabellum MG14 on a flexible mount for the observer

== See also ==
Related development

- Hansa-Brandenburg W.19
- Hansa-Brandenburg W.29
- Hansa-Brandenburg W.33

Related lists

- List of military aircraft of Germany
- List of seaplanes and flying boats

== Bibliography ==
- Gray, Peter & Thetford, Owen (1987) [1970]. German Aircraft of the First World War (2nd ed.). Putnam. ISBN 0-85177-809-7.
- Green, William & Swanborough, Gordon (2001) [1994]. The Complete Book of Fighters: An Illustrated Encyclopedia of Every Fighter Built and Flown (Revised and Updated ed.). Salamander Books. ISBN 1-84065-269-1.
- Grosz, Peter M. (1997). Brandenburg W 12. Windsock Datafile. Vol. 61. Albatros Productions. ISBN 0-948414-93-6.
- Klaauw, Bart van der (March–April 1999). "Unexpected Windfalls: Accidentally or Deliberately, More than 100 Aircraft 'arrived' in Dutch Territory During the Great War". Air Enthusiast (80): 54–59. ISSN 0143-5450.
- Owers, Colin A. (2015). Hansa-Brandenburg Aircraft of WWI: Volume 2–Biplane Seaplanes. Great War Aviation Centennial Series. Vol. 18. Aeronaut Books. ISBN 978-1-935881-32-2.
- Schmeelke, Michael (2018). Zeebrugge: Naval Air Station Flanders I 1914–1918. Aeronaut Books. ISBN 978-1-935881-46-9.
