= British Mass Spectrometry Society =

Educational charity

- Nickname: BMSS
- Predecessor: Mass Spectrometry Panel of the Hydrocarbon Research Group
- Established: 1964
- Founders: Alan Quayle
- Type: charity
- Registration no.: Charity registration number 281330
- Legal status: Charity
- Purpose: Education
- Headquarters: Northwich, Cheshire
- Location: United Kingdom
- Official language: English
- Secretary General: Dr Mark P. Barrow
- Chair: Dr Andy Ray
- Vice-Chair: Dr Mike Morris
- Treasurer: Dr Rhodri Owen
- Awards: BMSS Medal, Aston Medal
- Website: www.bmss.org.uk

The British Mass Spectrometry Society is a registered charity founded in 1964 that encourages participation in every aspect of mass spectrometry. It aims to encourage participation in all aspects of mass spectrometry on the widest basis, to promote knowledge and advancement in the field and to provide a forum for the exchange of views and information. The first foundations of the BMSS were laid in 1949 with the establishment of the Mass Spectrometry Panel by the Hydrocarbon Research Group.

== Conferences ==
The society's annual meeting is held in the first week of September as well as regular special interest group meetings (Lipidomics, MALDI & Imaging, Ambient Ionisation, Environmental & Food Analysis) through the year, in locations throughout the United Kingdom. Locations of the society's annual meetings beginning in 1965:

- 1965 BMSS1 U.C.London
- 1966 BMSS2 Birmingham
- 1968 BMSS3 U.C.London
- 1969 BMSS4 Sheffield
- 1971 BMSS5 Bristol
- 1972 BMSS6 Swansea
- 1974 BMSS7 Warwick
- 1975 BMSS8 Keele
- 1977 BMSS9 Swansea
- 1978 BMSS10 Durham
- 1980 BMSS11 Canterbury
- 1981 BMSS12 Cambridge
- 1983 BMSS13 Warwick
- 1984 BMSS14 Heriot-Watt
- 1986 BMSS15 Sussex
- 1987 BMSS16 York
- 1989 BMSS17 Nottingham
- 1990 BMSS18 U.C.London
- 1992 BMSS19 St Andrews
- 1993 BMSS20 Canterbury
- 1995 BMSS21 UMIST, Manchester
- 1996 BMSS22 Swansea
- 1998 BMSS23 Warwick
- 1999 BMSS24 Reading
- 2001 BMSS25 Southampton
- 2002 BMSS26 Loughborough
- 2004 BMSS27 Derby
- 2005 BMSS28 York
- 2007 BMSS29 Heriot-Watt
- 2008 BMSS30 York
- 2010 BMSS31 Cardiff
- 2011 BMSS32 Cardiff
- 2012 BMSS33 Alderley Park, Cheshire
- 2013 BMSS34 Eastbourne
- 2014 BMSS35 Alderley Park, Cheshire
- 2015 BMSS36 Birmingham
- 2016 BMSS37 Eastbourne
- 2017 BMSS38 Royal Northern College of Music, Manchester
- 2018 BMSS39 Churchill College, Cambridge
- 2019 BMSS40 Royal Northern College of Music, Manchester
- 2021 BMSS41 Sheffield Hallam University, Sheffield
- 2022 BMSS42 Royal Northern College of Music, Manchester
- 2023 BMSS43 Royal Northern College of Music, Manchester
- 2024 BMSS_BSPR Super Meeting Warwick Arts Centre, Coventry
- 2025 BMSS45 Edinburgh International Conference Centre, Edinburgh
- 2026 BMSS46 Royal Armouries Museum, Leeds

== Grants ==
In 1985, the Society used the proceeds from the 10th International Mass Spectrometry Conference to establish 7 Beynon PhD Studentships. In 2007, the Society announced they would initiate summer studentship projects and in 2012 they announced BMSS research grants.

== Publications ==
- Mass Matters

== Governance ==
=== Executive committee ===
The management of the Society is vested in an Executive Committee made up of Officers and General Members, they also act as Trustees of the Society. There are currently 10 officers of the Society namely the Chair, Vice-Chair, Treasurer, General Secretary, Meetings Secretary, Papers Secretary, Education Officer, Publicity Secretary, Special Interest Group Co-ordinator, and Digital Communications Officer.

=== Presidents ===
- John Monaghan 2003 - 2008

=== Past chairs ===
- John Beynon 1964-65
- John Waldron 1965-66
- Alan Quayle 1966-67
- Alan Maccoll 1967-69
- Keith Jennings 1969-71
- Dudley Williams 1971-72
- John Hasted 1973-74
- Norman Daly 1974-75
- Alan Carrick 1975-77
- Henry Wilson 1977-79
- Peter Knewstubb 1979-80
- John Todd 1980-82
- Dai Games 1982-83
- Allan Maccoll 1983-84
- Patrick Powers 1984-86
- Keith Jennings 1986-88
- Stan Evans 1988-90
- Frank Cottee 1990-92
- Chris Johnson 1992-94
- Tony Mallet 1994-96
- Alison Ashcroft 1996-98
- John Monaghan 1998-00
- Frank Pullen 2000-02
- Gareth Brenton 2002-04
- Mira Doig 2004-06
- Don Daley 2006-08
- Professor John Langley 2008-10
- Susan Crosland 2010-12
- Tony Bristow 2012-14
- Colin Creaser 2014-15
- Christine Eckers 2015-16
- Gavin O'Connor 2016-18
- Ashley Sage 2018-20
- Jackie Mosely 2020-2022
- Professor Neil Oldham 2022-2024

== Awards ==
=== Aston Medal ===
In 1987 the society announce the establishment of the Aston Medal to be awarded to “individuals deserving special recognition by reason of their outstanding contributions to knowledge in the biological, chemical, engineering, mathematical, medical, or physical sciences relating directly to mass spectrometry”.

=== BMSS Medal ===
In 2002 the BMSS Medal was established by the society “to recognise sustained contributions by individual members of the British Mass Spectrometry Society to the development of mass spectrometry, primarily within the UK.”

=== Prizes ===
The BMSS awards prizes to early career members during its annual meeting, named in honour of prominent past members.

==== Barber Prize ====
- Collen Maxwell
- Tia Hawkins

==== Bordoli Prize ====
- Maria Elena Catellani
- Atakan Nalbant

==== B.N. Green Prize ====
- Cara Jackson
- Callan Littlejohn
