= Norderney Airport =

Airfield serving Norderney island, Lower Saxony, Germany

Norderney Airport Flughafen Norderney
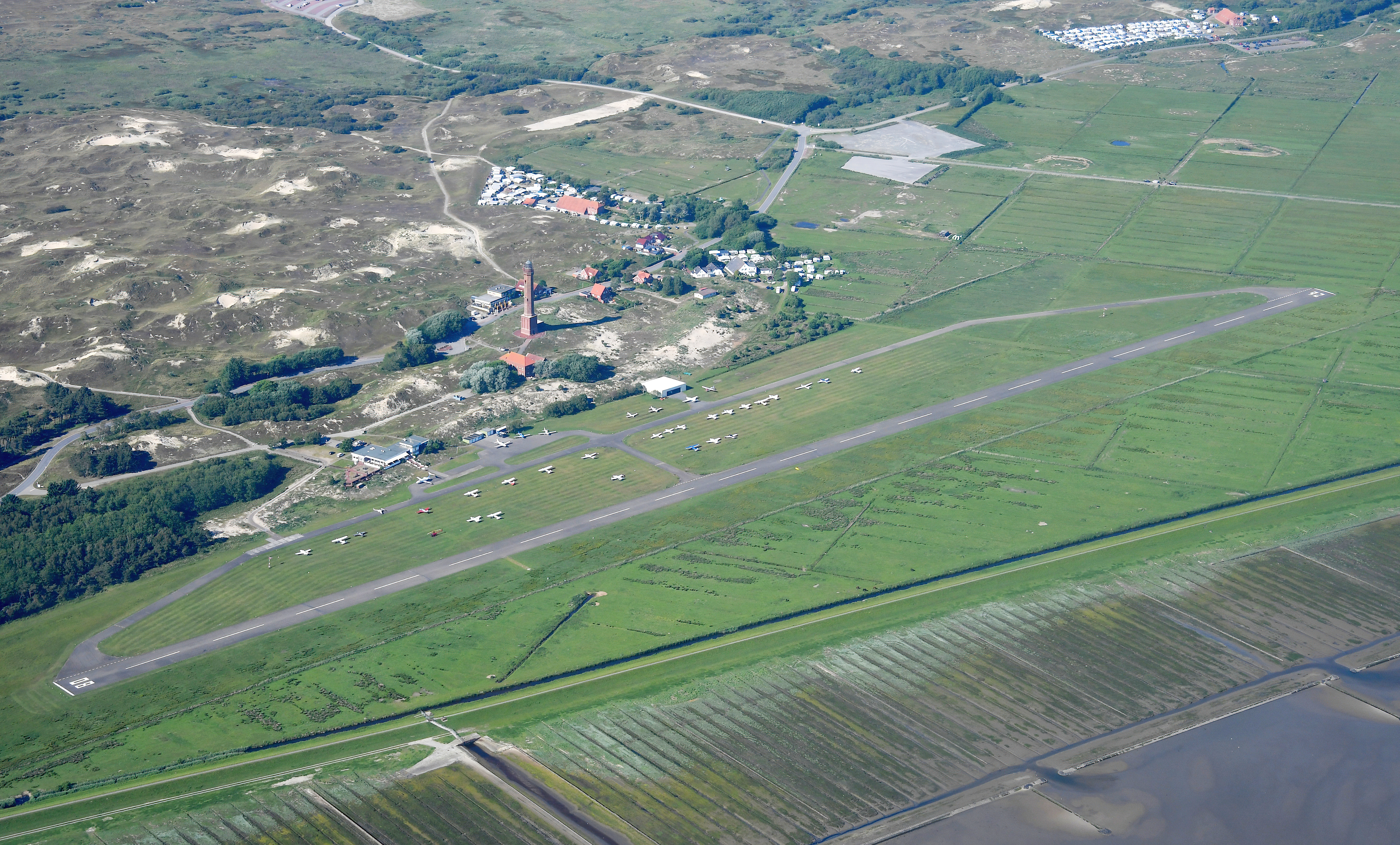
- IATA: NRD; ICAO: EDWY

Summary
- Airport type: Public
- Operator: Flughafen Norderney GmbH
- Location: Norderney, Germany
- Opened: 1970
- Elevation AMSL: 6 ft / 2 m
- Coordinates: 53°42.41′N 7°13.81′E
- Website: flughafen-norderney.de

Map
- Location in Lower Saxony

Runways
Direction	Length		Surface
Direction	m	ft	Surface
08/26	1,000	3,281	Asphalt

Statistics (2022)
- Passengers: ▼6,385
- Freight (in kilograms): ▼6,980
- Aircraft movements: ▲9,696
- Sources: DoD FLIP, Statistischer Bericht Luftverkehr

Norderney Airport (German: Flughafen Norderney, IATA: NRD, ICAO: EDWY) is an airport on the island of Norderney in Lower Saxony, Germany. Having been opened in 1970, the airport is an integral part of the island's infrastructure, serving as a faster way to get onto or off the island compared to shipping, and being available even when maritime traffic is suspended in the winter due to ice.

== History ==
In 1963, plans emerged to replace the island's makeshift airfield that was built in 1954 after the island's original airfield was converted into allotments in the aftermath of World War II. A new location was needed due to problematic wind conditions, the flood prone area, and a lack of space for expansion. In 1965, the new location was selected, an agricultural area near the island's lighthouse.

In 1968, construction of the airport starts, concluding in 1970. The airport and terminal building open. The next year, the airport is served by 30 daily connections, with long distance routes to Bielefeld, Bremen, Düsseldorf, and Hannover. In 1971, the airport sees 18,028 aircraft movements and 24,101 passengers.

In 1974, the airport's runway and taxiways are asphalted, with a project cost of DM 1.8M ($700,000). The year sees 20,000 aircraft movements and 48,000 passengers.

In 1976, airport lighting is installed to enable night operations. A Cessna 500 Citation of Ostfriesische Lufttransport is the first jet aircraft to land at the airport.

In 1985, 13,909 aircraft movements, 30,024 passengers, and 152,225 kilograms (335,599 lb) of freight are recorded at the airport.

In 1990, an overhaul of the terminal building is completed. That year sees 18,252 aircraft movements, 39,414 passengers, and 239,990 kilograms (529,090 lb) of freight.

In 1995, 16,696 aircraft movements and 38,948 passengers are recorded at the airport.

== Airlines and destinations ==
As of 1 March 2025, there are no regular commercial passenger flights to/from Norderney airport.
