= Hansa-Brandenburg W.29 =

German WWI two-seat fighter floatplane

W.29
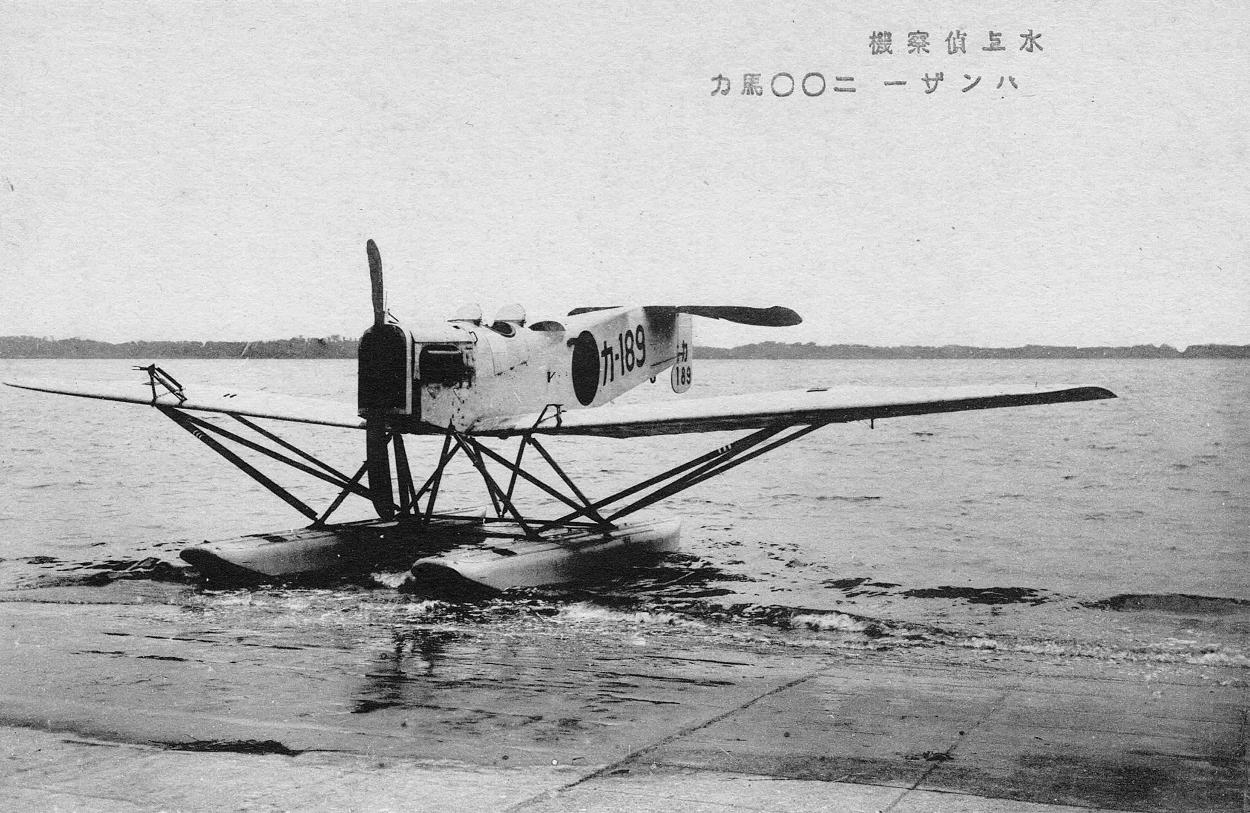
- A Japanese copy of the W.29

General information
- Type: Floatplane fighter
- Manufacturer: Hansa und Brandenburgische Flugzeug-Werke
- Designer: Ernst Heinkel
- Primary users: Kaiserliche Marine: Imperial Japanese Navy; Royal Danish Navy; Royal Norwegian Army
- Number built: About 402

History
- Manufactured: 1918–1919
- Introduction date: Mid-1918
- First flight: 27 March 1918
- Retired: 1936
- Developed from: Hansa-Brandenburg W.12

The Hansa-Brandenburg W.29 was a German two-seat fighter floatplane which served in the closing months of World War I with the Imperial German Navy's (Kaiserliche Marine) Naval Air Service (Marine-Fliegerabteilung) from bases on the North Sea coast. In concept the aircraft was a monoplane version of the Hansa-Brandenburg W.12 biplane, although there were many structural differences between the two.

Some examples were turned over to the victorious Allies for evaluation, although only the Imperial Japanese Navy ordered copies into production which remained in service until the early 1930s. The Royal Danish Navy purchased at least three aircraft by 1919 and built more under license which were phased out of service in 1930. The Royal Norwegian Army bought two smuggled aircraft from Hansa und Brandenburgische Flugzeug-Werke after the war which remained in service until around 1928.

Some of those aircraft that were sold on the civilian market after being discarded by the military were used as mail planes and fishery spotting duties. Other were modified with a passenger cabin replacing the aft cockpit.

== Background and description ==
Hansa-Brandenburg's technical director, Ernst Heinkel, claimed to have sketched the basic design of a monoplane version of the company's successful W.12 biplane floatplane fighter on the back of a wine-list while bored in a cabaret. "The modification from the W.12 was not so difficult. One only had to have intuition. The fuselage, the floats and the tail unit remained unchanged. I merely took off the upper wing, removed the centre section and enlarged the lower wing. That was all, in principle..." The detailed design of the aircraft and its stress calculations was done by Hanns Klemm.

The W.29 retained the company's signature plywood slab-sided fuselage configuration with four main longerons and stringers rising aft of the engine supports to elevate the observer's position and improve his field of fire. The fuselage retained its depth aft of the rear cockpit to improve the aircraft's lateral stability and narrowed to a vertical knife edge aft. The rudder was attached to this and extended slightly below the fuselage to give the observer as clear a field of fire as possible. The rudder of the first prototype was too small and had to be enlarged to improve control. There was no vertical stabilizer and the horizontal stabilizer was placed at the top of the fuselage to keep it clear of spray while taxiing. The shapes of the horizontal stabilizer and its elevators were revised midway during production to reduce aerodynamic interference between the tail structure and the elevator causing buffeting of the latter.

The wing was enlarged in length and chord and was almost rectangular, with nearly the same area as the W.12 wings. It had a dihedral of 3° 20" and tapered slightly at the leading and trailing edges. There was a small semi-circular cut-out at the rear wing root abreast the observer's cockpit. The wing was built around two wooden spars and several ribs; a false spar provided support for the ailerons. It varied in thickness over its length, the thickest portion where it met the supporting N-struts of the floats. The struts were built from steel tubing and were faired with plywood to reduce drag. From the front, the fuselage struts formed an inverted "W" shape with the horizontal braces separating the 1-step floats. Initially these were constructed from marine-grade plywood but duralumin was being used by the end of the war.

The W.29s built for the German Naval Air Service were ordered in two versions. The C3MG was fitted with two fixed 7.92-millimeter (0.312 in) lMG 08 machine guns on each side of the fuselage next to the engine and a 7.92 mm Parabellum MG 14 on a flexible mount for the observer, while the C2MGHFT had one fixed gun and a wireless telegraphy set. Each of the two cockpits was provided with a small hatch covered in cellon in the floor. The observer could drop one of the four 5-kilogram (11 lb) bombs stored in the cockpit through his hatch.

Each of the three prototypes was equipped with a different six-cylinder, water-cooled, inline piston engine: the Benz Bz.III, the BMW IIIa and the Mercedes D.III. Each of the engines produced roughly the same amount of horsepower (150–180 hp (110–130 kW)) but the Bz.III engine was selected for the initial production aircraft. Unlike the installation in the W.12, the exhaust manifold was removed and the exhaust pipes pointed upwards. Later batches generally used the more powerful Bz.IIIa engine but one batch of ten fighters used the BMW IIIa and the last, undelivered, batch of thirty W.29s were ordered with the Mercedes D.IIIa. One aircraft was tested with a 245 hp (183 kW) Maybach Mb.IVa engine; flight testing revealed that it was easier to fly, but not as maneuverable as other W.29s.

== Operational history ==
=== World War I ===
The third prototype was sent to the Naval Air Station Flanders I (Seeflugstation Flandern I, SFS I) at Zeebrugge in Occupied Belgium in May 1918 for a combat evaluation, although no records about its activities survive. The first documented combat involving the W.29 occurred on 4 June when four aircraft of the 1st Squadron, SFS I, led by the commander, Oberleutnant Friedrich Christiansen, encountered a British flight of three Felixstowe F2A flying boats searching for submarines, shooting down two and damaging the third. Two days later Christiansen led five W.29s from the 1st Squadron on a reconnaissance flight over the North Sea and spotted the British submarine HMS C25 surfacing. The floatplanes dropped to low altitude and machine-gunned the submarine, killing five men and puncturing its ballast tanks so that it was forced to remain on the surface. On 18 July, 1 Squadron on a long-range reconnaissance patrol off the Kentish coast with six or seven W.29s, surprised a pair of Short 184 floatplanes on an anti-submarine patrol that were escorted by a pair of Sopwith Camel land-based fighters. The guns of one British fighter soon jammed and they were unable to drive off the German aircraft. Both floatplanes were shot down, killing all four crewmen, while the Camels were able to disengage without damage.

W.29s were also deployed at Ostend, Belgium, Norderney and Borkum on the German Bight. One group of six W.29s from Borkum discovered a group of six British coastal motor boats on 11 August, searching for German minesweepers. Attacks by the aircraft with machine guns and small bombs forced the boats to run for safety in neutral Dutch waters. Two boats were blown up by their crews after they had exhausted all their fuel and ammunition but the remaining boats were successful, albeit badly damaged.

The Austro-Hungarian Navy (KuK Kriegsmarine) ordered 25 W.29s on 26 August 1918 to be built by UFAG at its factory in Budapest, Hungary, with delivery to commence before 31 October. Only one was completed before the end of the war and it saw no combat. Ten others were still under construction at the end of the war.

=== Postwar use ===
The terms of the Treaty of Versailles forced Germany to destroy or turn over all military aircraft to the victorious Allies and forbade production of military aircraft after it was signed in June 1919. The Allied Naval Armistice Commission organized a force of German seaplanes to search for and destroy naval mines by rifle fire after the war that included 25 unarmed W.29s. The German airline Deutsche Luft-Reederei operated at least one W.29 as a mail plane.

The Hungarian Soviet Republic, the successor state to the Kingdom of Hungary in the Austro-Hungarian Empire, ordered production of the W.29 at UFAG to restart. At least two were completed, which, with the W.29 completed for Austria-Hungary, were operated by the 9th Floatplane Squadron operating from the Danube River near Budapest and saw combat against Czechoslovak and Romanian forces in 1919.

Hansa-Brandenburg was able to continue to build W.29s, albeit in small numbers, until mid-1919. The British took seven W.29s and tested them at the MAEE (Marine Aircraft Experimental Establishment) in Felixstowe, one of which had been completed after the war. The Italians took three floatplanes and the Japanese fifteen, four of which were produced postwar. Nothing is known of the fates of the British and Italian aircraft but the Imperial Japanese Navy (IJN) copied the design and placed it into service.

The IJN aircraft were produced as the Hansa Type Reconnaissance Seaplane by Aichi and the Nakajima Aircraft Company as a replacement for the Yokosuka Ro-go Ko-gata floatplane, beginning in 1924, although the numbers built are in dispute. Japanese aviation historians Robert Mikesh and Shorzoe Abe claim a total of 310 aircraft built (150 by Aichi and 160 by Nakajima) but aviation historian Colin Owers believes that this is improbable since the Yokosuka plane remained in production until 1924 and he estimates that Nakajima only built 30. Although the dimensions of the Japanese Hansas were almost identical to those of the W.29, they were nearly 50 percent heavier than the Hansa-built aircraft and they were disliked by the Japanese pilots. They complained of poor downward visibility, poor directional control on the water, that it was difficult to land and was less maneuverable than the Yokosuka floatplane. Despite the problems the Hansas were used by the seaplane carrier Wakamiya in exercises in 1924 and 1925 and aboard battleships and light cruisers. They remained in front-line service until May 1929 and into the early 1930s as training aircraft. Some survivors were sold on the civilian market and used as mail planes, for fish spotting duties and as transports, modified with a four-passenger cabin replacing the rear cockpit.

The Royal Danish Navy purchased at least three W.29s in 1919 and copied the design for production by the Royal Danish Shipyard (Orlogsværftet) which built 15 between 1921 and 1927. The aircraft were assigned to the 1st Air Squadron upon its formation in 1926, the type remaining in service until 1930.

Two aircraft were bought by Norsk Aeroplanfabrikk of Norway in early 1920, their illegal export covered by the company claiming that they were destroyed in fires. They were leased by the factory to the Norwegian Army Air Service in May, but were purchased by the army later that year. They were supposedly fitted with controls in both cockpits, but the rear cockpit could be reconverted into the gunner's position at need. One aircraft was modified with the floats being replaced by a ski/wheel combination landing gear but was badly damaged in a crash. It was repaired and the floats were reinstalled. One aircraft had its engine replaced by a 185 hp (138 kW) BMW engine in 1923 and participated in exercises in Northern Norway that year and the following one. All floatplanes were ordered to be turned over to the Royal Norwegian Navy Air Service in 1928 but it is not certain that this was so as there is no record of either aircraft receiving a navy serial number.

== Variants ==
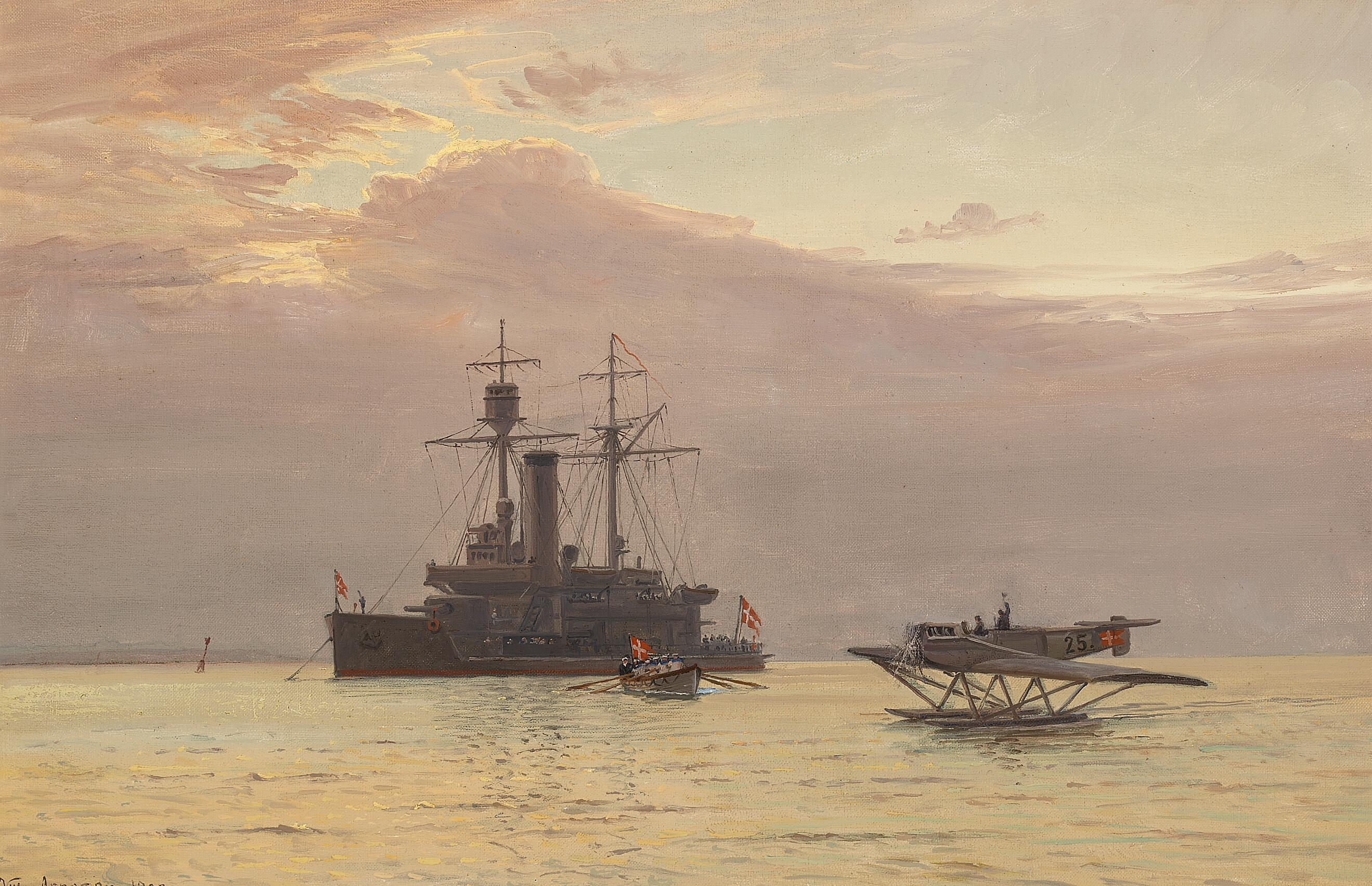
A Danish-built HM.1 delivering mail to the coastal defence ship Olfert Fischer in 1928. Painting by Vilhelm Arnesen.

W.29: Production aircraft from Hansa und Brandenburgische Flugzeug-Werke.

Måke I: Norwegian Army designation for the W.29.

Hanza-shiki suijō teisatsuki: (ハンザ式水上偵察機, Hansa Type Reconnaissance Floatplane): Modified to use a 200-horsepower (150 kW) license-built Hispano-Suiza 8B V-8 engine. Armed with a 7.7-millimeter (0.303 in) machine gun on a flexible mount.

Orlogsværftet HM.1: Licensed production in Denmark of 15 HM.1s, powered by the 150 hp Benz or the 160 hp (120 kW) Orlogsværftet O-V six-cylinder inline engine. The floatplanes were initially armed with a fixed Vickers machine gun and one or two Madsen machine guns on a Scarff-type mount. The elevators were enlarged in 1925 to cure stability problems and a windscreen was installed for the observer that same year. At some point an exhaust manifold was installed that discharged behind the left wing and provision was made for an auxiliary fuel tank beneath the fuselage. To make the aircraft less nose heavy, the Vickers gun was removed in 1927.

W.29(U): The license-built models ordered by the Austro-Hungarian Navy were powered by a 185 hp (138 kW) Austro-Daimler 6. They were armed with a single fixed 8-millimeter (0.315 in) Schwarzlose machine gun and another on a flexible mount for the observer.

== Operators ==
Austria-Hungary
Austro-Hungarian Navy - One completed during World War I.

Denmark
Royal Danish Navy - At least three W.29s bought from Germany in 1919.

Germany
Imperial German Naval Air Service - 229 ordered, 198 delivered during the war (one crashed before acceptance), from April 1918.

Hungary
Hungarian Soviet Republic - At least two built when the government ordered UFAG to restart production in 1919.

Japan
Imperial Japanese Navy - approximately 180 built by the Nakajima Aircraft Company and Aichi Kokuki.

Norway
Norwegian Army - two ex-German W.29s bought in 1920.

Romania
Romanian Maritime Aviation Corps - The 6th Hidroaviation Group (Grupul 6 Hidroaviație) used as many as 12.

== Specifications (W.29) ==
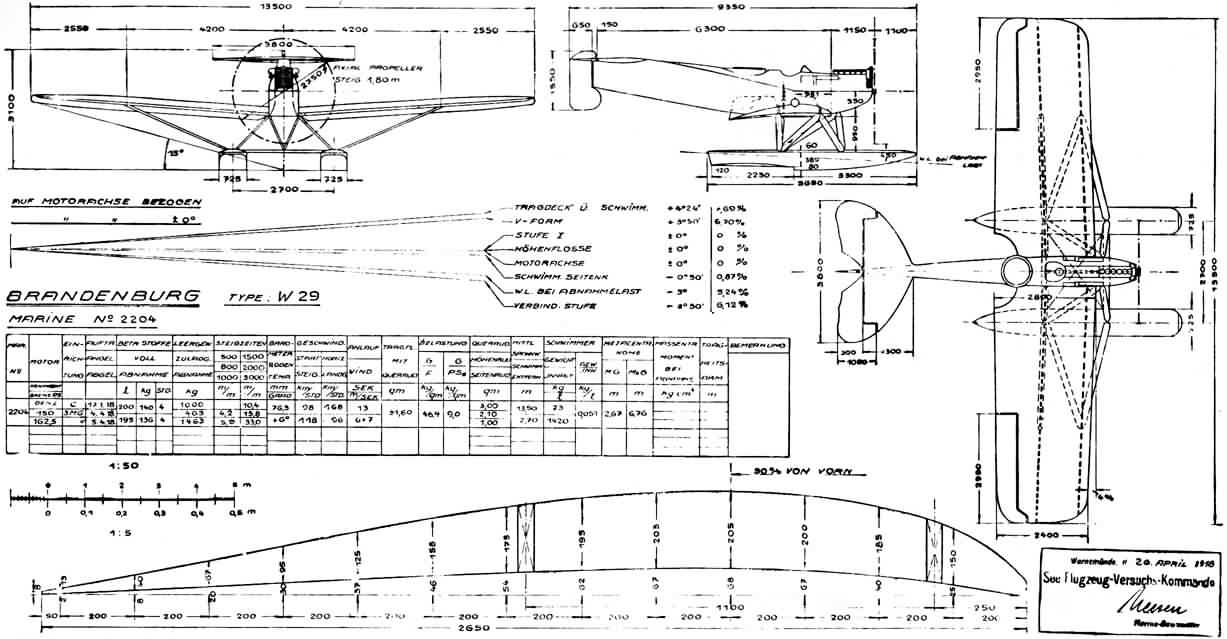
Baubeschreibung-style Hansa-Brandenburg W.29 drawing for German government submission

Data from German Aircraft of the First World War

General characteristics

- Crew: 2 (pilot & observer/gunner)
- Length: 9.36 m (30 ft 9 in)
- Wingspan: 13.5 m (44 ft 3 in)
- Height: 3 m (9 ft 10 in)
- Wing area: 32.2 m^{2} (347 sq ft)
- Empty weight: 1,000 kg (2,205 lb)
- Gross weight: 1,494 kg (3,294 lb)
- Powerplant: 1 × Benz Bz.III 6-cylinder water-cooled in-line piston engine, 112 kW (150 hp)
- Propellers: 2-bladed fixed-pitch propeller

Performance

- Maximum speed: 175 km/h (109 mph, 94 kn)
- Range: 520 km (320 mi, 280 nmi)
- Endurance: ca. 4 hours
- Service ceiling: 5,000 m (16,000 ft)
- Time to altitude: 1,000 m (3,300 ft) in 6 minutes

2,000 m (6,600 ft) in 13 minutes
3,000 m (9,800 ft) in 23 minutes

Armament

- Guns: 1 or 2 × fixed forward 7.9 mm (0.312 in) lMG 08 machine guns

1 × 7.9 mm (0.312 in) Parabellum MG14 in rear cockpit

== See also ==
- Hansa-Brandenburg W.33

Related lists

- List of military aircraft of Germany
- List of seaplanes and flying boats

== Bibliography ==
- Bronnenkant, Lance J. (2019). "Friedrich Christiansen". The Blue Max Airmen: German Airmen Awarded the Pour le Mérite. Vol. 13: Keller, Christiansen, Bongartz. n.p.: Aeronaut Books. pp. 26–81. ISBN 978-1-935881-71-1.
- Gray, Peter & Thetford, Owen (1987) [1970]. German Aircraft of the First World War (2nd ed.). London: Putnam. ISBN 0-85177-809-7.
- Green, William & Swanborough, Gordon (2001) [1994]. The Complete Book of Fighters: An Illustrated Encyclopedia of Every Fighter Built and Flown (Revised and Updated ed.). London: Salamander Books. ISBN 1-84065-269-1.
- Grosz, Peter M. (1996). Brandenburg W 29. Windsock Datafiles. Vol. 55. Berkhamsted, UK: Albatros Productions. ISBN 0-948414-74-X.
- Heinkel, Ernst (1956). He 1000. London: Hutchinson & Co. OCLC 271280351.
- Herris, Jack (2012). German Seaplane Fighters of WWI: A Centennial Perspective on Great War Seaplanes. Great War Aviation Centennial Series. Vol. 2. Charleston (S.C.): Aeronaut Books. ISBN 978-1-935881-09-4.
- Mikesh, Robert C. & Abe, Shorzoe (1990). Japanese Aircraft, 1910-1941. Annapolis, Maryland: Naval Institute Press. ISBN 1-55750-563-2.
- Owers, Colin A. (2015). Hansa-Brandenburg Aircraft of WWI: Volume 3–Monoplane Seaplanes. Great War Aviation Centennial Series. Vol. 19. Reno, Nevada: Aeronaut Books. ISBN 978-1-935881-33-9.
- Owers, Colin A. (September–October 1997). "Zeebrugge's Hornets: The Brandendurg Monoplanes: Part One". Air Enthusiast. No. 71. pp. 29–30, 34. ISSN 0143-5450.
- Schmeelke, Michael (2018). Zeebrugge: Naval Air Station Flanders I 1914–1918. Reno, Nevada: Aeronaut Books. ISBN 978-1-935881-46-9.
