= Spectroswiss =

Swiss manufacturer of mass spectrometry equipment

- Company type: Private
- Industry: Life Sciences
- Founded: 2014; 11 years ago in Lausanne, Switzerland
- Founder: Yury Tsybin
- Headquarters: Lausanne, Switzerland
- Products: FTMS equipment and software
- Website: spectroswiss.ch

Spectroswiss is a Swiss technology company developing and producing hardware components and software for Fourier transform mass spectrometry. The company was formed in 2014 as a spin-out from the Biomolecular Mass Spectrometry Laboratory at Ecole Polytechnique Fédérale de Lausanne in Switzerland. The company's headquarters are located in Lausanne, Switzerland, with subsidiary in Cambridge, Massachusetts.
