= Scott A. McLuckey =

American chemist

- Education: Westminster College; Purdue University
- Known for: Mass Spectrometry
- Awards: Biemann Medal; Thomson Medal; Curt Brunnée Award
- Scientific career
- Fields: Chemist
- Workplaces: Purdue University

Scott A. McLuckey is an American chemist, the John A. Leighty Distinguished Professor of Chemistry at Purdue University. His research concerns the formation of ionized versions of large biomolecules, mass spectrometry of these ions, and ion-ion reactions.

McLuckey did his undergraduate studies at Westminster College, Pennsylvania, earning a B.S. in 1978. He received his Ph.D. in 1982 from Purdue University. After a year of postdoctoral studies in Amsterdam, McLuckey joined the research staff of Oak Ridge National Laboratory, where he remained until 2000 when he moved to Purdue. He became the Leighty professor in 2008. Since 1998 he has been editor of the International Journal of Mass Spectrometry. From 2010 to 2012 he was president of the American Society for Mass Spectrometry.

In 1997, he was the first recipient of the Biemann Medal awarded by the American Society for Mass Spectrometry for his contributions to mass spectrometry. He was named scientist of the year at Oak Ridge in 1999. In 2000, he received the Curt Brunnée Award of the International Mass Spectrometry Society, given annually to a researcher under the age of 45. He received the 2007 Award in Chemical Instrumentation of the American Chemical Society Division of Analytical Chemistry, and the Anachem Award in 2008 from the National Federation of Analytical Chemistry and Spectroscopy. He also received the 2008 Herbert Newby McCoy Award for outstanding contributions to science from Purdue.
