= Donald F. Hunt =

American analytical-biochemistry professor

- Education: University of Massachusetts
- Known for: mass spectrometry
- Awards: Thomson Medal
- Scientific career
- Fields: Chemistry
- Workplaces: University of Virginia
- Doctoral advisor: Marvin Rausch and Peter Lillya
- Other academic advisors: Klaus Biemann

Donald F. Hunt is the University Professor of Chemistry and Pathology at the University of Virginia. He is known for his research in the field of mass spectrometry, he developed electron capture negative ion mass spectrometry. He has received multiple awards for his work including the Distinguished Contribution Award from the American Society for Mass Spectrometry and the Thomson Medal from the International Mass Spectrometry Society.

== Early life and education ==
He received his B.S. and Ph.D. from the University of Massachusetts Amherst and was a National Institutes of Health Postdoctoral trainee under Klaus Biemann at MIT.

== The Hunt laboratory ==
The Hunt laboratory develops new methodology and instrumentation centered on mass spectrometry based proteomics for the characterization of proteins and their modifications.

== Research interests ==
Among his many research interests, Hunt investigates how the immune system uses peptides to kill diseased cells, and how modifications to chromatin-associated proteins called histones create a "Code" that may be involved in many gene regulation events.

== Awards ==
Hunt has been awarded several honors including the Distinguished Contribution Award from the American Society for Mass Spectrometry in 1994; the Christian B. Anfinsen Award from the Protein Society; the Chemical Instrumentation Award and Field and Franklin Award from the American Chemical Society; the Thomson Medal from the International Mass Spectrometry Society; the Human Proteome Organization's Distinguished Achievement Award in Proteomics, and the Association of Biomolecular Resource Facilities 2007 Award. In addition, he also received the Charles H. Stone Award (American Chemical Society) and the Pehr Edman Award for outstanding achievements in the application of mass spectrometry. He received the Chemical Instrumentation Award sponsored by the American Chemical Society in 1997.
