= Archeological chemistry =

Archeological chemistry is a chemical method to analyze and identify archaeological findings.

Most of the documents which were made in the beginning of the second millennium BC were made of clay. During a century of research, documents which were found in the archives of the Ancient Near East have been published. The documents have provided a wealth of information, but they have also raised questions about their origins. The questions have been a source of debate, sometimes unresolved. By chemically identifying the documents, their origin can be identified.

== Identification methods ==
The identification methods examine the mineral composition and the chemical elements of the clays and the binders in the material, and compare them with the geological databases. In this way, it is possible in many cases to determine the origin of the documents and the technological processes, which were used in their creation. The geographical origin of the documents is not always the same as the place where they were discovered during the excavations.

=== The minerals in the material ===
The research method which was based upon the application of mineralogical-petrographic analytical methods to archaeological material findings, mainly pottery, began its first steps in the first half of the twentieth century. Petrography is the geological research method that examines the composition of minerals in the material (originally in rocks) by examining them in slides under an optical microscope equipped with various aids, including a system of polarizing filters, which block light rays according to their polarity (the electromagnetic bonds between the atoms in the material). This method allows the identification of different crystalline phases within the material, which are the different stages in the process of the material while reaching a solid state.

In collaboration with Nadav Na'aman and Israel Finkelstein, The documents from Amarna were examined in this method, as well as the documents from Ugarit, in collaboration with Yoram Cohen.

=== Portable spectrophotometer ===
The testing method creates a difficult due to the need of taking a sample of the material for testing. Minimal sampling reduces the damage to the document, but the mere act of taking the sample results in a refusal by the museum.

The solution was using a portable X-Ray fluorescence (XRF) device with a silicon drift detector, which detects up to 34 chemical elements with a high accuracy. The device, which is similar in size and shape to a regular hair dryer, can be transported on an airplane as hand luggage, and allows for non-invasive analyses of the chemical composition of documents in museum exhibition halls or storage. It processes the data, determines their origin, and compares it to the databases based on documents from the Ancient Near East, whose origin has been examined using previous analytical methods and this method as well. This test revealed that a version of the Epic of Gilgamesh documents, which was found in Tel Megiddo, was created in Gezer.

This portable spectrophotometer examined the documents of Hattusa, the capital of the Hittite Empire, which were kept in the Vorderasiatisches Museum Berlin, as well as the documents from Amarna in Berlin and in The British Museum. The research was done by Yuval Goren and Jörg Klinger.
