= John H. Beynon =

Welsh chemist and physicist (1923–2015)

John Herbert Beynon
- Born: 29 December 1923; Ystalyfera, Wales
- Died: 24 August 2015 (aged 91); Swansea, Wales
- Education: University of Wales Swansea
- Awards: Thomson Medal (1985); Field and Franklin Award (1987); Aston Medal (1990)
- Scientific career
- Fields: Chemistry, physics
- Workplaces: Swansea University

1st Chair of the Executive Committee, British Mass Spectrometry Society
- In office 1964–1965
- Preceded by: office established
- Succeeded by: John Waldron

John H. Beynon FRS (29 December 1923 – 24 August 2015) was a Welsh chemist and physicist known for his work in mass spectrometry.

== Education and military service ==
Beynon was born in the Welsh coal-mining town of Ystalyfera and was the older of two brothers. He went on to attend the University of Wales at Swansea (now Swansea University) in the early 1940s at the start of World War II. He received a B.S. in physics in 1943. He did not attend graduate school, instead deciding to join the Fighting Vehicles Research Establishment where he served between 1943 and 1947 developing tank fire-control systems.

== Career in industry ==
Between the year 1947 and 1969, Beynon was Manager of Physics and Physical, Polymer and Analytical Chemistry at Imperial Chemical Industries. Between 1947 and 1950, Beynon constructed what was to become the first mass spectrometer designed to study organic compounds unrelated to petroleum. He subsequently collaborated with Metropolitan-Vickers to produce the MS8 mass spectrometer, a prototype of the Associated Electrical Industries (AEI) MS9 mass spectrometer.

Beynon was made a senior research associate in 1964 which allowed him the opportunity to carry out his own research. He was a Boomer Memorial Fellow at the University of Minnesota in 1965.

== Academic career ==
Beynon took a position as Professor of Chemistry and Director of the Mass Spectrometry Center at Purdue University in 1968. In 1974 Beynon accepted a position as Royal Society Research Professor and Director of the Mass Spectrometry Research Unit at Swansea University.

== Awards and honours ==
Beynon received the Sigma Xi Research Award, Purdue University in 1973, the Marice F. Hasler Award in 1979, the Jozef Stefan Medal in 1980, the Medal of the Serbian Chemical Society in 1981, the Techmart Trophy of the British Technology Group in 1984, the Jan Marc Marci Medal, Czechoslovak Spectroscopic Society in 1984, the International Mass Spectrometry Society Thomson Medal in 1985, the American Chemical Society Field and Franklin Award for Outstanding Work in Mass Spectrometry in 1987, the British Mass Spectrometry Society Aston Medal in 1998, and the Italian Mass Spectrometry Society Gold Medal in 1990.

He was the Founder chairman British Mass Spectrometry Society (1960), a founding member of the American Society for Mass Spectrometry (1967), and Founder President of the European Mass Spectrometry Society (1993). Beynon was elected to the Royal Society in 1971.

He authored over 350 scientific publications. and several books on mass spectrometry.

In 1987, Beynon was founding editor-in-chief of the journal Rapid Communications in Mass Spectrometry.

== See also ==
- Mass-analyzed ion-kinetic-energy spectrometry
- Unimolecular ion decomposition
