= International Mass Spectrometry Foundation =

- Formation: 1998
- Type: Nonprofit
- Headquarters: Montanalaan 8; 7313 CJ Apeldoorn
- Location: The Netherlands
- President: G. John Langley
- Website: http://www.imss.nl/

The International Mass Spectrometry Foundation (IMSF) is a non-profit scientific organization in the field of mass spectrometry. It operates the International Mass Spectrometry Society, which consists of 37 member societies and sponsors the International Mass Spectrometry Conference that is held once every two years.

== Aims ==
The foundation has four aims:

1. organizing international conferences and workshops in mass spectrometry
2. improving mass spectrometry education
3. standardizing terminology in the field
4. aiding in the dissemination of mass spectrometry through publications

== Conferences ==
Before the formation of the IMSF, the first International Mass Spectrometry Conference was held in London in 1958 and 41 papers were presented. Since then, conferences were held every three years until 2012, and every two years since. Conference proceedings are published in a book series, Advances in Mass Spectrometry, which is the oldest continuous series of publications in mass spectrometry. The International Mass Spectrometry Society evolved from this series of International Mass Spectrometry Conferences. The IMSF was officially registered in the Netherlands in 1998 following an agreement at the 1994 conference.

Past meetings were held in these locations:

- Melbourne (2024)
- Maastricht (2022)
- Florence (2018)
- Toronto (2016)
- Geneva (2014)
- Kyoto (2012)
- Bremen (2009)
- Prague (2006)
- Edinburgh (2003)
- Barcelona (2000)
- Tampere (1997)
- Budapest (1994)
- Amsterdam (1991)
- Bordeaux (1988)
- Swansea (1985)
- Vienna (1982)
- Oslo (1979)
- Florence (1976)
- Edinburgh (1973)
- Brussels (1970)
- Berlin (1967)
- Paris (1964)
- Oxford (1961)
- London (1958)

== Awards ==
The society sponsors several awards including the Curt Brunnée Award for achievements in instrumentation by a scientist under 45 years of age, the Thomson Medal Award for achievements in mass spectrometry, as well as travel awards and student paper awards:

Curt Brunnée Award winners:

- 2024: Jens Soltwisch (University of Münster)
- 2022: Erin S. Baker (University of North Carolina at Chapel Hill)
- 2020: Livia S. Eberlin (Baylor College of Medicine)
- 2018: Daniel Austin (Brigham Young)
- 2016: Yury Tsybin (Spectroswiss)
- 2014: Dimitris Papanastasiou (Fasmatech)
- 2012: Zheng Ouyang (Purdue University)
- 2009: Alexander Makarov (Thermo Scientific)
- 2006: Roman Zubarev (Uppsala University)
- 2003: Michisato Toyoda (Osaka University)
- 2000: Scott McLuckey (Purdue University)
- 1997: Michael Guilhaus (University of New South Wales)
- 1994: Gareth Brenton (Swansea)

== See also ==
- American Society for Mass Spectrometry
- British Mass Spectrometry Society
- Canadian Society for Mass Spectrometry
- List of female mass spectrometrists
