= List of women mass spectrometrists =

This is a list of notable women mass spectrometrists with significant scientific contribution towards advancement in theories, instrumentation and applications of mass spectrometry. The list is organized by the chemical societies and their major awards related to mass spectrometry, as well as presidency.

== American Chemical Society ==
The Frank H. Field and Joe L. Franklin Award for Outstanding Achievement in Mass Spectrometry is the major mass spectrometry award offered by the American Chemical Society.

=== Frank H. Field and Joe L. Franklin Award for Outstanding Achievement in Mass Spectrometry (since 1985) ===
- 2021 Veronica M. Bierbaum
- 2020 Kimberly A. Prather
- 2019 Jennifer S. Brodbelt
- 2018 Carol Vivien Robinson
- 2017 Vicki H. Wysocki
- 2015 Hilkka I. Kenttämaa
- 2010 Catherine E. Costello
- 2008 Catherine C. Fenselau
- 1990 Marjorie G. Horning

== American Society for Mass Spectrometry ==
The major awards from the American Society for Mass Spectrometry are John B. Fenn Award for a Distinguished Contribution in Mass Spectrometry, Biemann Medal, Fellows of ASMS, Research Award, Research at Primarily Undergraduate Institutions (PUIs) Award, Al Yergey Mass Spectrometry Scientist Award, Ron Hites Award, and Diversity, Equity, Inclusion, and Accessibility Mentorship Award. A number of notable women mass spectrometrists served as presidents of the American Society for Mass Spectrometry.

=== John B. Fenn Award for a Distinguished Contribution in Mass Spectrometry (since 1990) ===
- 2024 Jennifer Brodbelt
- 2023 Carol Vivien Robinson
- 2017 Catherine E. Costello
- 2012 Catherine C. Fenselau
- 2009 Vicki H. Wysocki

=== Biemann Medal (since 1997) ===
- 2025 Livia S. Eberlin
- 2022 Erin S. Baker
- 2020 Ying Ge
- 2019 Sarah Trimpin
- 2016 Kristina Håkansson
- 2014 Lingjun Li
- 2008 Julia Laskin
- 2000 Julie A. Leary

=== Fellows of ASMS (since 2025) ===
- 2026 Veronica M. Bierbaum, Catherine E. Costello, Kristina Hakansson, Lisa M. Jones, Susan D. Richardson
- 2025 Erin S. Baker, Catherine C. Fenselau, P. Jane Gale, Susan Weintraub

=== Research Award (since 1986) ===
- 2025 Tian (Autumn) Qiu
- 2024 Elizabeth K. Neumann
- 2023 Kelly Marie Hines and Stacy Malaker
- 2022 Gloria Sheynkman
- 2021 Xin Yan
- 2019 Eleanor Browne
- 2014 Kerri A. Pratt
- 2013 Yu Xia
- 2012 Ileana M. Cristea and Sharon J. Pitteri
- 2011 Judit Villen
- 2010 Sarah Trimpin
- 2007 Rebecca Jockusch
- 2006 Heather Desaire
- 2005 Kristina Hăkansson
- 2004 Lingjun Li
- 2003 Andrea Grottoli
- 2001 Deborah S. Gross
- 2000 Elaine Marzluff
- 1998 Mary T. Rodgers
- 1997 M. Judith Charles
- 1994 Kimberly A. Prather
- 1993 Susan Graul
- 1992 Vicki H. Wysocki
- 1991 Hilkka I. Kenttämaa
- 1990 Jennifer Brodbelt
- 1987 Susan Olesik

=== Research at Primarily Undergraduate Institutions (PUIs) Award (since 2019) ===
- 2025 Emma Guiberson
- 2023 Erica Jacobs
- 2021 Christine Hughey
- 2019 Callie Cole

=== Al Yergey Mass Spectrometry Scientist Award (since 2019) ===
- 2023 Amina Woods
- 2022 Martha M. Vestling
- 2020 Rachel Ogorzalek Loo

=== Ron Hites Award: for an exemplary paper published in the previous two volumes of the Journal of the American Society for Mass Spectrometry (since 2009) ===
- 2022 Elyssia Gallagher
- 2019 Julia Laskin
- 2009 Alison Ashcroft

=== Diversity, Equity, Inclusion and Accessibility Mentorship Awards (since 2024) ===
- 2026 Lisa M. Jones
- 2025 Jennifer Geddes-McAlister and Renã A. S. Robinson

=== President and Past Presidents (since 1953) ===
- 2022–2024 Julia Laskin
- 2020–2022 Susan Richardson
- 2016–2018 Vicki Wysocki
- 2014–2016 Jennifer Brodbelt
- 2012–2014 Susan Weintraub
- 2006–2008 Barbara S. Larsen
- 2002–2004 Catherine E. Costello
- 1996–1998 Veronica M. Bierbaum
- 1982–1984 Catherine Fenselau

== Australian and New Zealand Society for Mass Spectrometry ==
The major awards from the Australian and New Zealand Society for Mass Spectrometry (ANZSMS) are the ANZSMS Medal, Morrison Medal, Bowel Medal, Michael Guilhaus Research Award and ANZSMS Fellows.

=== ANZSMS Medal (since 2009) ===
- The award has not been given to a female mass spectrometrist since award inception in 2009.

=== Morrison Medal (since 1990) ===
- 2025 Nicki Packer
- 2023 Ute Roessner
- 2017 Kliti Grice
- 2003 Margaret Sheil

=== Bowie Medal (since 2009) ===
- 2021 Michelle Colgrave
- 2017 Tara Pukala

=== Michael Guilhaus Research Award (since 2015) ===
- 2025 Sarah E. Hancock

=== ANZSMS Fellows (since 2014) ===
- 2014 Margaret Sheil

== Brazilian Society of Mass Spectrometry ==
The major award of the Brazilian Society of Mass Spectrometry is the BrMASS Manuel Riveros Medal.

=== BrMASS Manuel Riveros Medal ===
- 2024 Livia S. Eberlin, Debora Azevedo
- 2022 Lidija Nikolaevna Gall, Julia Laskin, Claudia Moraes de Rezende, Rosa Erra-Balsells
- Maria Fernanda Georgina Gine Rosias
- Conchetta Cacheres

== British Mass Spectrometry Society ==
The major awards of the British Mass Spectrometry Society (BMSS) are the Aston Medal, the BMSS Medal, and the BMSS Life Membership.

=== Aston Medal (since 1987) ===
- 2011 Carol V. Robinson

=== BMSS Medal (since 2002) ===
- 2019 Alison Ashcroft

=== BMSS Life Membership ===
- Alison Ashcroft
- Anna Upton
- Mira Doig

== Canadian National Proteomics Network ==
The major awards of the Canadian National Proteomics Network (CNPN) are the CNPN-Tony Pawson Proteomics Award, and the New Investigator Award.

=== CNPN-Tony Pawson Proteomics Award (since 2010) ===
- 2020 Anne-Claude Gingras
- 2019 Jennifer Van Eyk

=== New Investigator Award (since 2020) ===
- 2022 Jennifer Geddes-McAlister

== Canadian Society for Mass Spectrometry ==
The major award of the Canadian Society for Mass Spectrometry is the Fred P. Lossing Award.

=== Fred P. Lossing Award (since 1994) ===
- 2018 Ann English
- 2017 Helene Perreault

=== Young Investigator Award (since 2018) ===
- 2024 Jennifer Geddes-McAlister
- 2019 Dajana Vuckovic

== Chinese American Society for Mass Spectrometry ==
The major awards of the Chinese American Society for Mass Spectrometry (CASMS) is the Young Investigator Award.

=== Young Investigator Award (since 2022) ===
- 2023 Xueyun Zheng
- 2022 Ling Hao, Xin Yang, Hui Ye

== Females in Mass Spectrometry ==
The major awards of the Females in Mass Spectrometry (FeMS) are the Catherine E. Costello Award and the Indigo BioAutomation FeMS Distinguished Contribution Award.

=== Catherine E. Costello Award (since 2020) ===
- 2020 Sarah Brown Riley

=== Indigo BioAutomation FeMS Distinguished Contribution Award (since 2022) ===
- 2022 Olga Vitek

== German Mass Spectrometry Society (Deutsche Gesellschaft für Massenspektrometrie, DGMS) ==
The major awards of the German Mass Spectrometry Society (Deutsche Gesellschaft für Massenspektrometrie, DGMS) are the Mattauch-Herzog Award for Mass Spectrometry, Wolfgang Paul Lecture, Mass Spectrometry in the Life Sciences Award, and Life Science Prize.

=== Mattauch-Herzog Award for Mass Spectrometry (since 1988) ===
- 2022 Charlotte Uetrecht
- 2004 Andrea Sinz

=== Wolfgang Paul Lecture (since 1997) ===
- 2024 Kimberly A. Prather
- 2019 Vicki Wysocki
- 2015 Catherine E. Costello
- 1998 Chava Lifshitz

=== Mass Spectrometry in the Life Sciences Award (2009–2024) ===
- 2022 Andrea Sinz
- 2018 Michal Sharon
- 2015 Jana Seifert
- 2009 J. Sabine Becker

=== Life Science Prize (2002–2007) ===
- 2002 Jasna Peter-Katalinic

== Human Proteome Organization ==
The major awards of the Human Proteome Organization are the Distinguished Achievement in Proteomic Sciences Award, Discovery in Proteomic Sciences Award, Clinical & Translational Proteomics Award, Science & Technology Award, and Distinguished Service Award.

=== Current and Past Presidents ===
- 2023-2024 Jennifer Van Eyk
- 2021-2022 Yu-Ju Chen
- 2011-2012 Catherine E. Costello

=== Distinguished Achievement in Proteomic Sciences Award (since 2004) ===
- 2025 Yu-Ju Chen
- 2021 Nicolle H. Packer
- 2020 Karin Rodland
- 2019 Jennifer Van Eyk
- 2018 Kathryn K. Lilley
- 2015 Amanda Paulovich
- 2012 Carol Robinson
- 2004 Angelika Görg

=== Discovery in Proteomic Sciences Award (since 2007) ===
- 2021 Paola Picotti
- 2019 Anne-Claude Gingras
- 2018 Ulrike Kusebauch
- 2017 Ileana Cristea
- 2008 Catherine E. Costello

=== Clinical & Translational Proteomics Award (since 2014) ===
- 2023 Rebekah Gundry
- 2022 Connie Jimenez
- 2021 Ying Ge
- 2018 Peipei Ping
- 2015 Jennifer Van Eyk

=== Science & Technology Award (since 2011) ===
- 2019 Olga Ornatsky
- 2015 Selena Larkin
- 2014 Rosa Viner
- 2013 Christie Hunter

=== Distinguished Service Award (since 2004) ===
- 2015 Catherine E. Costello
- 2013 Peipei Ping
- 2006 Catherine C. Fenselau

== International Mass Spectrometry Foundation ==
The major awards from the International Mass Spectrometry Foundation are the Thomson Medal Award, the Curt Brunnée Award, and the Jochen Franzen Award.

=== Thomson Medal Award (since 1985) ===
- 2024 Jennifer S. Brodbelt
- 2022 Vicki Wysocki and Lidia Gall
- 2020 Alison E. Ashcroft
- 2014 Carol V. Robinson
- 2009 Catherine E. Costello and Catherine. C. Fenselau

=== Curt Brunnée Award (since 1994) ===
- 2022 Erin S. Baker
- 2020 Livia S. Eberlin

=== Jochen Franzen Award (since 2022) ===
- 2024 Ljiljana Paša-Tolić

== Israeli Society for Mass Spectrometry ==
A number of notable women mass spectrometrists served as presidents of the Israeli Society for Mass Spectrometry.

=== Past Presidents (since 1985) ===
- Michal Sharon
- 2009 Alla Shainskaya
- Tsippy Tamiri
- Chagit Denekamp
- 1991 Chava Lifshitz

== Royal Society of Chemistry ==
The Mass Spectrometry Award is the only award of the Royal Society of Chemistry, which is specifically for the field mass spectrometry.

=== Mass Spectrometry Award (2001-2008) ===
- 2001 Carol V. Robinson

== Swedish Mass Spectrometry Society ==
The Swedish Mass Spectrometry Society recognizes distinguished contribution to Swedish mass spectrometry with its Gold Berzelius Medal and early career contribution with its Silver Berzelius Medal.

=== Gold Berzelius Medal (since 2014) ===
- 2022 Kristina Håkansson

=== Silver Berzelius Medal (since 2015) ===
- 2024 Anneli Kruve
- 2018 Ingela Lanekoff

== Swiss Group for Mass Spectrometry ==
The major award of the Swiss Group for Mass Spectrometry (SGMS) is the SGMS Award.

=== SGMS Award (since 2014) ===
- 2016 Paola Picotti

== Taiwan Society for Mass Spectrometry ==
The major awards of the Taiwan Society for Mass Spectrometry include the Taiwan Society for Mass Spectrometry Medal and the Outstanding Scholar Research Award.

=== Taiwan Society for Mass Spectrometry Medal (since 2017) ===
- 2020 Yu-Ju Chen 陳玉如

=== Outstanding Scholar Research Award (since 2011) ===
- 2018 Shu-Hui Chen 陳淑慧
- 2012 Mei-Chun Tseng 曾美郡
- 2011 Yu-Ju Chen 陳玉如

== The Association for Mass Spectrometry and Advances in Clinical Lab ==
The major award of the Association for Mass Spectrometry and Advances in Clinical Lab (MSACL) is the MSACL Distinguished Contribution Award.

=== MSACL Distinguished Contribution Award (since 2015) ===
- 2025 Christa Cobbaert
- 2023 US Jennifer Van Eyk
- 2017 EU Isabelle Fournier
- 2017 US Catherine C. Fenselau
- 2015 EU Linda Thienpont

== U.S. Human Proteome Organization ==
The major awards of the U.S. Human Proteome Organization are the Donald F. Hunt Distinguished Contribution in Proteomics Award, Catherine E. Costello Lifetime Achievement in Proteomics Award, Gilbert S. Omenn Computational Proteomics Award, and Robert J. Cotter New Investigator Award.

=== Donald F. Hunt Distinguished Contribution in Proteomics Award (since 2018) ===
- 2021 Peipei Ping
- 2019 Jennifer Van Eyk

=== Catherine E. Costello Award for Exemplary Achievements in Proteomics (the former Catherine E. Costello Lifetime Achievement in Proteomics Award) (since 2019) ===
- 2026 Lingjun Li
- 2025 Ileana Cristea
- 2024 Jennifer Van Eyk
- 2022 Catherine C. Fenselau
- 2019 Catherine E. Costello

=== Gilbert S. Omenn Computational Proteomics Award (since 2016) ===
- 2021 Olga Vitek

=== Robert J. Cotter New Investigator Award (since 2013) ===
- 2022 Stephanie M. Cologna
- 2020 Si Wu
- 2018 Leslie Hicks
- 2016 Paola Picotti
- 2014 Judit Villen
- 2013 Rebecca Gundry
