= Zeng Rong =

Chinese biochemist

Zeng Rong (Chinese: 曾嵘; pinyin: Céng Róng) is a Chinese biochemist researching and developing technology for proteomics research. She is currently a professor at the Institute of Biochemistry and Cell Biology at the Shanghai Institutes for Biological Sciences.

== Education ==
Zeng graduated from the Biology department at Hunan Normal University in China in 1995, with a Bachelor's degree. She then got her doctoral degree in biochemistry and molecular biology in 2000, at the Institute of Biochemistry and Cell Biology, Shanghai Institutes for Biological Sciences, Chinese Academy of Sciences. She was mentored by a famous protein analyst Xia Qichang.

== Career ==
Zeng has been working at the Institute of Biochemistry and Cell Biology where she got her doctoral degree since 2000 after her graduation. She works as a doctoral supervisor, and she is also the principal investigator of her research group. She was offered to be an editor of the magazine Proteomics in January 2005, and Molecular and Cell Proteomics in 2006. Zeng was also accepted as a committee member of HUPO in September 2009.

She has received honors and awards including the National Science Fund in 2004 and the Chinese Young Women in Science Fellowship Award in 2005.

=== Research focus ===
Zeng's main focus is on proteomics and the dynamic behavior of proteins. She leads a research team at the Institute of Biochemistry and Cell Biology at the Shanghai Institute for Biological Sciences to make progress in methodology development, application of quantitative proteomics, and regulation mechanism of protein dynamic behavior.

Her team developed novel methods for proteomics research including multi-dimensional LC-MS/MS that can aid protein profiling, phosphopeptide enrichment, and multiplex quantitation. They applied quantitative proteomics in cell signaling and biomarker discovery of diabetes. Their work on proteins in and around cancer cells in human liver achieved better understanding of liver cancer. In order to regulate the mechanisms involved in the dynamic behavior of proteins, Zeng and her team utilized epigenetic, transcriptomic, and MiRNA data along with proteomic data to find out how biological molecules interact on a systematic level.

== Contributions to science ==
Zeng has published multiple papers in journals including but not limited to Electrophoresis, Nature, Science, Proteomics, BMC Genomics, Journal of Proteome Research, the Journal of Molecular Cell Biology, and Molecular & Cellular Proteomics. Some selected work listed below:

- Ren, SX; Fu, G; Jiang, XG; et al. (April 2003). "Unique physiological and pathogenic features of Leptospira interrogans revealed by whole-genome sequencing". Nature. 422 (6934): 888–93. Bibcode:2003Natur.422..888R. doi:10.1038/nature01597. PMID 12712204.. The experimental result was used to help vaccine-related application.
- Jin, WH; Dai, J; Li, SJ; Xia, QC; Zou, HF; Zeng, R (2005). "Human plasma proteome analysis by multidimensional chromatography prefractionation and linear ion trap mass spectrometry identification". J Proteome Res. 4 (2): 613–9. doi:10.1021/pr049761h. PMID 15822942.. Her studies in the large scale proteome profiling was cited to bring up topics on related potential clinical applications.
- Wang, Q; Zhang, Y; Yang, C; Xiong, H; Lin, Y; Yao, J; Li, H; Xie, L; Zhao, W; Yao, Y; Ning, ZB; Zeng, R; Xiong, Y; Guan, KL; Zhao, S; Zhao, GP (2010). "Acetylation of metabolic enzymes coordinates carbon source utilization and metabolic flux". Science. 327 (5968): 1004–7. Bibcode:2010Sci...327.1004W. doi:10.1126/science.1179687. PMC 4183141. PMID 20167787.. The team's discovery helped developing the idea about the conservation of certain mechanisms from bacteria to human.
- Liu, YS; Luo, XY; Li, QR; Li, H; Li, C; Ni, H; Li, RX; Wang, R; Hu, HC; Pan, YJ; Chen, HQ; Zeng, R (2012). "Shotgun and targeted proteomics reveal that pre-surgery serum levels of LRG1, SAA, and C4BP may refine prognosis of resected squamous cell lung cancer". J Mol Cell Biol. 4 (5): 344–7. doi:10.1093/jmcb/mjs050. PMID 23042802.. Figures from this paper was referred to as a confirmation to experimental results from similar researches done by other scientists.
