= Peipei Ping =

Cardiac physiology scientist

- Education: University of Arizona
- Scientific career
- Fields: proteomics, cardiac physiology, systems biology, data science
- Workplaces: University of California, Los Angeles
- Thesis: Autoregulation of blood flow during sympathetic nerve stimulation in the arteriolar network on cat sartorius muscle (1990)
- Doctoral advisor: Paul C. Johnson

Peipei Ping is an academic specializing in cardiac physiology, system biology and data science.

== Education ==
Peipei Ping received a BS in biomedical engineering at Zhejiang University in 1985, and a PhD in cardiovascular physiology at University of Arizona in 1990, under the direction of Paul C. Johnson. She completed post-doctoral research at University of North Carolina at Chapel Hill (1991-1992) and at University of California San Diego (1992-1994).

== Career ==
Ping began her academic career as assistant professor at University of Louisville in 1996, and was promoted to associate professor in 2000. She became a full professor in physiology, medicine and bioinformatics when she moved to the David Geffen School of Medicine at University of California, Los Angeles in 2002. She conducts research in proteomics, systems biology and data science, particularly in advancing cardiac physiology. She co-authored the article on Guidelines for experimental models of myocardial ischemia and infarction, which won the American Physiological Society Best Paper for Review Article in 2019.

She is a Fellow of the Cardiovascular Section of the American Physiological Society, a Fellow of the International Society for Heart Research, and a Fellow of the American Heart Association. She was part of the leadership team of the National Institute of Health Big Data to Knowledge Program (BD2K). She was principal investigator of Heart BD2K, one of BD2K Centers of Excellence; and program director of the BD2K Centers Coordinating Center.

Ping serves on the editorial board of Circulation, Clinical Proteomics, and Proteomics, and on the editorial advisory board of Journal of Proteome Research. She served as president of the North American Section of the International Society of Heart Research, and as chair of the Publication Committee and secretary general of the Human Proteome Organization. She is currently serving on the board of directors of U.S. Human Proteome Organization.

== Awards ==
- 2021 U.S. Human Proteome Organization Donald F. Hunt Distinguished Contribution in Proteomics Award
- 2018 Human Proteome Organization Clinical & Translational Proteomics Award
- 2017 Institute of Cardiovascular Sciences Ken Bowman Research Achievement
- 2015 American Physiological Society Robert M. Berne Distinguished Lectureship
- 2013 Human Proteome Organization Distinguished Service Award
- 2012 American Heart Association Thomas W. Smith Memorial Lecture
- 2010 National Institute of Health Method To Extend Research in Time (MERIT) Award NIH-R37–63901
- 2000-2001 University of Louisville Provost's Awards for Exemplary Advising
