= Barbara S. Larsen =

Mass spectrometrist

Barbara Seliger Larsen
- Education: Santa Clara University(BS); University of Delaware(PhD)
- Awards: DuPont Pederson Medal (2015); Eastern Analytical Symposium (EAS) Award for Outstanding Achievements in Mass Spectrometry(2020)
- Scientific career
- Fields: Chemistry
- Workplaces: DuPont
- Thesis: Structure and energetics of metal containing ions : ion cyclotron resonance and collision induced decomposition mass spectrometric studies (1983)
- Doctoral advisor: Douglas P. Ridge

Barbara Seliger Larsen is a mass spectrometrist, with a career in instrumentations and applications of mass spectrometry in industry, and served on the board of the American Society for Mass Spectrometry for several terms.

== Early life and education ==
Larsen earned a BS in chemistry from Santa Clara University in 1978, and a PhD in chemistry under the direction of Douglas P. Ridge from University of Delaware in 1983. She completed her post-doctoral research with Catherine Fenselau at Johns Hopkins University.

== Career ==
Larsen worked for more than 35 years at DuPont. In her research in mass spectrometry, she worked with a number of ionization sources, from electrospray ionization, matrix-assisted laser desorption/ionization, solid probe introduction with corona discharge ionization, to laserspray ionization. Her fluorinated polymer extraction method, the Larsen method, is required by the Environmental Protection Agency for consumer safety. She is a consultant at Larsen Scientific Consulting.

She serves on the editorial advisory board of Spectroscopy. She was an editor for the Journal of the American Society for Mass Spectrometry. She served on a number of board positions for the American Society for Mass Spectrometry: treasurer (1992-1994), vice president for programs (2004-2006), president (2006-2008), and past president (2008-2010). She was elected as an American Chemical Society Fellow in 2017.

== Honors and awards ==
- 2010 American Chemical Society The Delaware Section Award
- 2015 Dupont Pederson Medal
- 2016 the Analytical Scientist The Power List 2016 Top 50 most influential women
- 2020 Eastern Analytical Symposium (EAS) Award for Outstanding Achievements in Mass Spectrometry

== Books and book chapters ==
Books

- Fulton G. Kitson; Barbara S. Larsen, Charles N. McEwen (1996) Gas Chromatography and Mass Spectrometry: A Practical Guide Academic Press.
- Barbara S. Larsen; Charles N. McEwen (Eds.) (2014) Mass Spectrometry of Biological Materials. 2nd Edition. CRC Press.

Book chapters

- Charles N. McEwen; Barbara S. Larsen (1997) Electrospray ionization on quadrupole and magnetic-sector mass spectrometers, in Electrospray ionization mass spectrometry: fundamentals, instrumentation, and applications. Richard B. Cole (Ed.) Wiley. 177–202.
- Sarah Trimpin; David E. Clemmer; Barbara S. Larsen (2010) Snapshot, Conformation, and Bulk Fragmentation of Polymeric Architectures using ESI–IMS–MS, in Ion Mobility Spectrometry–Mass Spectrometry: Theory and Applications. CRC Press. 215–235.
