= Yu-Ju Chen =

Proteogenomics research scientist

- 陳玉如
- Official portrait, 2026

Vice President of the Academia Sinica
- Incumbent
- Assumed office 21 June 2026
- President: Chen Chien-jen
- Preceded by: Tang K. Tang

Personal details
- Education: National Taiwan University (BS); Iowa State University (PhD)
- Scientific career
- Fields: proteomics, mass spectrometry
- Workplaces: Academia Sinica
- Thesis: Unimolecular dissociation of polyatomic ions by molecular beam photoionization mass spectrometry and collision-induced dissociation (1997)
- Doctoral advisor: Cheuk-Yiu Ng

Yu-Ju Chen (Chinese: 陳玉如; pinyin: Chén Yùrú) is a Taiwanese physical chemist who leads international projects in proteogenomics.

== Education ==
After graduating from National Taiwan University, Chen completed doctoral studies in the United States and earned his Ph.D. in physical chemistry from Iowa State University in 1997 under professor Cheuk-yiu Ng. She then completed post-doctoral research at Ames Laboratory in 1997, and then at Yuan-Pern Lee's group at National Tsing Hua University in 1999.

== Career ==
Chen began her career at the Institute of Chemistry of Academia Sinica as assistant research fellow in 1999. She was the Director of the Institute of Chemistry from 2013 to 2019, and is currently a Distinguished Research Fellow. She is also an adjunct professor at National Taiwan University, National Chiayi University, National Taiwan Ocean University, and National Chung Hsing University. She conducts research in mass spectrometry-based bioinformatics, in relation to understanding diseases such as cancer.

Since 2016, Chen has participated in the US Cancer Moonshot Initiative, providing proteogenomics expertise as representative of Academia Sinica. She is the project investigator for the Taiwan Cancer Moonshot Project, which analyzes multiomic data related to gastric cancer. She participates in the Chromosome-centric Human Proteome Project, and is the group lead of chromosome 4.

Chen served as president for the Human Proteome Organization (2021-2022), the Taiwan Proteomics Society, and the Taiwan Society for Mass Spectrometry (2012-2015). She has been a council member of the Asia Oceania Human Proteome Organization since 2019. She current serves as executive director of the Taiwan Proteomics Society (2021-2023), and the Taiwan Society for Mass Spectrometry. She served on editorial boards of European Journal of Mass Spectrometry, Journal of Proteome Research, and Frontiers in Analytical Chemistry, and currently serves on the Executive Advisory Board of Proteomics.

== Awards ==
- 2023 Tung-Ho Outstanding Research Award, THS Foundation
- 2023 16th Taiwan Outstanding Women in Science Awards, Wu Chien Shiung Education Foundation & L'ORÉAL Taiwan
- 2022 Outstanding Research Award, National Science and Technology Council
- 2022 Outstanding Research Award, National Science and Technology Council
- 2021 National Innovation Award
- 2020 Taiwan Society for Mass Spectrometry Medal
- 2011 Taiwan Society for Mass Spectrometry Outstanding Scholar Award
- 2007 Federation of Asian Chemical Societies Distinguished Young Chemists Award
- 2006 Chinese Chemical Society Outstanding Young Investigator Award
