= František Tureček =

Czech-American chemist

- Born: Prague
- Education: Charles University
- Known for: mass spectrometry
- Awards: Thomson Medal
- Scientific career
- Fields: Analytical chemistry, mass spectrometry
- Workplaces: Cornell University; University of Washington
- Academic advisors: Fred McLafferty
- Website: depts.washington.edu/chem/people/faculty/turecek.html

František Tureček is a Czech-American chemist and professor of chemistry at the University of Washington. His research focuses on the chemistry of highly reactive molecules and mass spectrometric instrumentation and gas-phase ion chemistry.

== Early life ==
Tureček was born in Prague and received a PhD in organic chemistry from Charles University in 1977. He left Czechoslovakia in 1987 and joined Fred McLafferty's lab at Cornell University. He was appointed associate professor at the University of Washington in 1990, became full Professor in 1995 and was appointed the Klaus and Mary Ann Saegebarth Endowed Professor of Chemistry in 2013.

Tureček is one of the founding Editors of the Journal of Mass Spectrometry and has been on the editorial advisory boards of the International Journal of Mass Spectrometry and the Journal of the American Society for Mass Spectrometry. He has received several awards during his career, including the P. B. Hopkins Faculty Award (2006), the Czech Head-Patria Science Prize (2010), the Johannes Marcus Marci Spectroscopy Award (2010), the Thomson Medal of the International Mass Spectrometry Foundation (2012), and the John Gustavus Esselen Award for Chemistry in the Public Interest from the Northeastern Section of the American Chemical Society (2013). He is an Honorary Member of the Czech Mass Spectrometry Society. In 2013 he was elected Fellow of the American Association for the Advancement of Science.
