= Brian T. Chait =

South African scientist and mass spectrometrist

- Born: July 6, 1949
- Education: University of Cape Town; Oxford University
- Scientific career
- Fields: mass spectrometry
- Workplaces: Rockefeller University

Brian T. Chait (6 July 1949) is a South African physicist and mass spectrometry researcher known for his work on mass spectrometry imaging as well as protein-protein interaction and protein structure elucidation. Some of his most well known work includes the contributions to identify the structure of the nuclear pore complex.

== Career and Research ==
Beckey graduated from the University of Cape Town in 1970 and then received his PhD at Oxford University in 1976. He then moved to Canada to work in the lab of Ken Standing where he started to work on applications of mass spectrometry to study molecular biology. In 1979 he moved to Rockefeller University where he was promoted to associate professor in 1985 and to full professor in 1991. In his career, Chait has contributed to the ionization of molecules using lasers and to protein structure elucidation.

== Awards and Recognitions ==
Chait received the Bijvoet Medal of the Bijvoet Centre for Biomolecular Research in 2000, the 2002 Frank H. Field and Joe L. Franklin Award from the American Chemical Society, the Discovery Award in Proteomics Sciences from HUPO in 2007, the 2015 Distinguished Contribution Award from the American Society for Mass Spectrometry as well as the US HUPO Lifetime Achievement Award in 2021.
