= Jennifer Van Eyk =

Scientist researching clinical proteomics

Jennifer E. Van Eyk
- Born: Northern Ontario, Canada
- Education: University of Alberta
- Scientific career
- Workplaces: Cedars-Sinai
- Thesis: Peptide chemistry answers questions in muscle regulation (1991)
- Doctoral advisor: Robert S. Hodges

Jennifer Eileen Van Eyk is a Canadian scientist who is the Erika Glazer Chair in Women's Heart Health, the Director of Advanced Clinical Biosystems Institute in the Department of Biomedical Sciences, the Director of Basic Science Research in the Women's Heart Center, a Professor in Medicine and in Biomedical Sciences at Cedars-Sinai.

== Early life and education ==
Jennifer E. Van Eyk was born in Northern Ontario, Canada. She obtained a bachelor of science in biology and chemistry from the University of Waterloo in 1982. She received a PhD in biochemistry under the direction of Robert S. Hodges from University of Alberta in 1991. She conducted post-doctoral research at University of Heidelberg, University of Alberta, and University of Illinois at Chicago with R. John Solaro.

== Career ==
Van Eyk began her academic career in 1996 as an assistant professor in the Department of Physiology at Queen's University, Kingston, Canada, and she was promoted to associate professor and received tenure in 2001. She then left Canada to join Johns Hopkins University as the Director of the Proteomics Innovation Center in Heart Failure in 2003, and later Cedars-Sinai in 2014.

Van Eyk is a member-at-large and a council member of Human Proteome Organization, and the president of US Human Proteome Organization. She was a technical briefs editor at Proteomics. She served on the editorial board of Proteomics: clinical application and Journal of Physiology and Circulation Research. She currently serves on the editorial board of Clinical Proteomics. She is a Fellow of the International Society for Heart Research. and is a Fellow of the American Heart Association.

== Research ==
She is an international leading scientist in clinical proteomics. She is the founding director of Cedars-Sinai Advanced Clinical Biosystems Research Institute, whose motto is “from discovery to patient care”.

She is co-editor of Clinical Proteomics: From Diagnosis to Therapy, a good book in clinical proteomics and translational medicine.

Her list of publications: https://www.ncbi.nlm.nih.gov/sites/myncbi/1VsYqQYH8535l/bibliography/48183272/public/.

== Awards ==
- 2024 The Analytical Scientist Power List, Human Health Heroes
- 2024 The Karger Medal, Barnett Institute of Chemical & Biological Analysis, NorthWestern University
- 2024 Richard Simpson Lecturer Award, Australian Proteomics Society
- 2024 U.S. Human Proteome Organization Catherine E. Costello Award for Exemplary Achievements in Proteomics
- 2023 The International Society of Heart Research, International President’s Lecture Award
- 2023 The Analytical Scientist Power List - Leaders and Advocates
- 2022 The Association for Mass Spectrometry and Advances in Clinical Lab (MSACL)Distinguished Contribution Award
- 2021 The Analytical Scientist Power List
- 2020 The Analytical Scientist Power List
- 2019 Human Proteome Organization Distinguished Achievement in Proteomic Sciences Award
- 2019 US Human Proteome Organization The Donald F. Hunt Distinguished Contribution in Proteomics award
- 2019 Canadian National Proteomics Network The Tony Pawson Proteomics Award
- 2017 The Analytical Scientist Power List: Top 10 Omics Explorers
- 2015 Human Proteome Organization Clinical & Translational Proteomics Award
- 2014 American Heart Association Council on Genomic and Precision Medicine Medal of Honor
- 2013 American Heart Association Council on Genomic and Precision Medicine Distinguished Achievement Award

== Recent Patents ==
- Role of citrullination in diagnosing diseases (2021) US 11,105,817 B2
- Biomarkers of myocardial injury (2021) US 11,041,865 B2
- Correlated peptides for quantitative mass spectrometry (2019) US 10,352,942 B2
- Citrullinated proteins: a post-translated modification of myocardial proteins as marker of physiological and pathological disease (2019) US 10,309,974 B2
- Diagnostic assay for Alzheimer's disease (2017) US 9,678,086 B2
