= Richard Caprioli =

American chemist

Richard M. Caprioli
- Born: April 12, 1943 (age 83); New York City
- Education: Columbia University
- Known for: Mass spectrometry imaging, nanoflow electrospray ionization
- Awards: Thomson Medal
- Scientific career
- Fields: mass spectrometry
- Workplaces: Vanderbilt University
- Academic advisors: David Rittenberg

Richard M. Caprioli (born 12 April 1943) is an American chemist known for his contributions to mass spectrometry imaging.

== Career and research ==
Caprioli was born in New York City and graduated from Columbia University in 1969 with a PhD, studying under David Rittenberg. He then moved to Purdue University to work with John Beynon, where he was appointed as assistant professor of biochemistry in 1970. In 1975, he moved to University of Texas Medical School where be became full professor. In 1998 he moved to Vanderbilt University where he was appointed the Stanford Moore Professor of Biochemistry and is the director of the Mass Spectrometry Research Center.

During his graduate work, he developed continuous-flow fast atom bombardment, that allowed coupling of fast atom bombardment with a continuous flow for the first time. Later, he worked on engineering nanoflow electrospray ionization, which became a standard technique in mass spectrometry. More recently, another major contribution to the field of mass spectrometry was his application of MALDI mass spectrometry for imaging of biological samples. First published in 1997, the technique has been widely adopted and has been used to visualize proteins, peptides, drugs and other small molecules in tissue and other biological materials.

Caprioli served as president of the American Society for Mass Spectrometry from 2000 to 2002 and has been the editor in chief of the Journal of Mass Spectrometry since 1990 and a founding board member of the US arm of the Human Proteome Organization. He has published over 300 scientific papers and three books, holds over 10 patents. He has received the Thomson Medal and the John B. Fenn Award, an honorary degree from the University of Naples, the 2006 Field and Franklin Award from the American Chemical Society, the 2010 Eastern Analytical Society Award for Achievements in Mass Spectrometry and the 2010 HUPO Distinguished Achievement Award in Proteomic Sciences.

Caprioli has a son and a daughter.
