= Lingjun Li =

Chinese-born Wisconsin professor

- Born: Beijing, China
- Education: Beijing University of Technology (BE); University of Illinois at Urbana-Champaign (PhD)
- Awards: Biemann Medal (2014)
- Scientific career
- Fields: Chemistry
- Workplaces: University of Wisconsin-Madison
- Thesis: Following Neuropeptide Processing, Distribution, Transport, and Release Using Novel Mass Spectrometric Approaches (2000)
- Doctoral advisor: Jonathan V. Sweedler

Lingjun Li is a Professor in the School of Pharmacy and Department of Chemistry at University of Wisconsin-Madison. She develops mass spectrometry based tools to study neuropeptides, peptide hormones and neurotransmitters.

== Early life and education ==
Li was born in Beijing, China in 1969. She graduated from Beijing University of Technology in 1992, and did an internship at Environment Canada. She received a PhD in Chemistry from the University of Illinois at Urbana-Champaign in 2000, under the direction of Jonathan Sweedler.

== Career ==
From 2000 to 2002, Li conducted postdoctoral research at Pacific Northwest National Laboratory (Richard Smith), Brandeis University (Eve Marder), and University of Illinois (Jonathan Sweedler). She then joined University of Wisconsin-Madison as Assistant Professor in 2002. She was promoted to Associate Professor in 2008, and Full Professor in 2012. She has been appointed as a Vilas Distinguished Achievement Professor since 2015, and Charles Melbourne Johnson Distinguished Chair in Pharmaceutical Sciences.

She serves on the US Human Proteome Organization Board of Directors, Chinese American Society for Mass Spectrometry Board of Directors, and on the editorial board for Journal of the American Society for Mass Spectrometry, Journal of Pharmaceutical Analysis and Frontiers in Biology. She was the President of the Chinese American Society for Mass Spectrometry (2013-2015), and an Associate Editor for Analytical Methods (2013-2016).

== Awards ==
- 2004 American Society for Mass Spectrometry Research Award
- 2005 National Science Foundation Career Award
- 2006 Sloan Research Fellowships
- 2011 Pittsburgh Conference Achievement Award
- 2014 American Society for Mass Spectrometry Biemann Medal
- 2016 Analytical Scientist The Power List - Top 50 most influential women in the analytical sciences
- 2019 Analytical Scientist The Power List
- 2021 Analytical Scientist The Power List
- 2024 Analytical Scientist The Power List, Human Health Heroes
- 2026 U.S. Human Proteome Organization The Catherine E. Costello Award for Exemplary Achievements in Proteomics

== Patent applications ==
- Isobaric tandem mass tags for quantitative proteomics and peptidomics (2012) US 9388132 B2
- Mass defect-based multiplex dimethyl pyrimidinyl ornithine (DiPyrO) tags for high-throughput quantitative proteomics and peptidomics (2016) AU 2016338691 A1
- Isobaric Multiplex Reagents for Carbonyl Containing Compound High-Throughput Quantitative Analysis (2019) US 20190225559 A1
- Development of a Novel Mass Spectrometry-Based Method for Simultaneous Qualitative and Quantitative Protein Citrullination Analysis of Complex Biological Samples (2020) US 20210181206 A1
