= European Journal of Mass Spectrometry =

- Discipline: Chemistry
- Language: English
- Edited by: Jürgen Grotemeyer

Publication details
- History: 1995–present
- Publisher: SAGE Publishing
- Frequency: Bimonthly
- Impact factor: 1.1 (2025)

Standard abbreviations
- ISO 4: Eur. J. Mass Spectrom.

Indexing
- ISSN: 1469-0667 (print); 1751-6838 (web)

Links
- Journal homepage; Online access; Online archive

The European Journal of Mass Spectrometry is a peer-reviewed scientific journal covering all areas of mass spectrometry. It is published by SAGE Publishing and the editor-in-chief is Jürgen Grotemeyer (Kiel University).

== See also ==
- Mass Spectrometry Reviews
- Journal of Mass Spectrometry
- Journal of the American Society for Mass Spectrometry
- Rapid Communications in Mass Spectrometry
