= Yingge =

Yingge may refer to:

- Yingge, Taibai, Baoji, Shaanxi, China
- Yingge dance, a form of Chinese folk dance originating from the Ming Dynasty
- Yingge District, New Taipei, Taiwan
- Yingge railway station, a railway station on the Taiwan Railways Administration West Coast line
- Yingge Sea
- Yingge Software Park in Dalian Hi-tech Zone
- Yingge Village (鶯歌里), Anle District, Keelung, Taiwan
- Yingge Village (英格村), Menglai Township, Cangyuan Va Autonomous County, Yunnan, China
- Wanyan Yingge (完顏盈歌; 1094–1103), one of "Wild" Jurchens or Sheng Jurchen (生女眞)

== See also ==
- Ying Ge, a Chinese-American chemist
