= Catherine E. Costello =

Biochemist

- Education: Georgetown University
- Scientific career
- Workplaces: Boston University School of Medicine
- Thesis: Electrophilic brominations of poly-substituted olefins; reactions and NMR studies (1971)

Catherine E. Costello is the William Fairfield Warren distinguished professor in the department of biochemistry, Cell Biology and Genomics, and the director of the Center for Biomedical Mass Spectrometry at the Boston University School of Medicine.

== Education ==
Catherine E. Costello attended the Emmanuel College in Boston for her undergraduate studies in chemistry, and minors in mathematics and physics. She received a Master of Science (1967) and a PhD from Georgetown University (1971). After graduation, she did post-doctoral research with Klaus Biemann at Massachusetts Institute of Technology.

== Career ==
Prior to founding the Center for Biomedical Mass Spectrometry at Boston University School of Medicine in 1994, Costello was a senior research scientist and the associate director of the National Institutes of Health Research Resource for Mass Spectrometry at Massachusetts Institute of Technology for 20 years. She is a William Fairfield Warren Distinguished Professor and the director of the Center for Biomedical Mass Spectrometry at the Boston University School of Medicine.

Costello served as the president of the American Society for Mass Spectrometry (2002–2004), the Human Proteome Organization (2011–2012), and the International Mass Spectrometry Foundation (2014–2018). She currently serves on the board of directors of the US Human Proteome Organization, and the editorial board of Clinical Proteomics.

== Research ==
Her research involves structural characterization of biopolymers using mass spectrometry-based techniques, such as liquid chromatography-mass spectrometry, thin-layer chromatography-mass spectrometry, Fourier-transform ion cyclotron resonance mass spectrometry, matrix-assisted laser desorption/ionization time-of-flight mass spectrometry, microfluidic capillary electrophoresis-mass spectrometry, and ion mobility spectrometry-mass spectrometry. She was one of the first scientists to characterize glycoconjugates with tandem mass spectrometry. Her 1988 article has been cited over two thousand times. She participated in the Human Proteome Project, the SysteMHC Atlas project, and the Minimum Information Required for a Glycomics Experiment (MIRAGE) project.

== Awards ==
- 2023 Analytical Scientist the Power List - Leaders and Advocates
- 2020 Society for Glycobiology Molecular and Cellular Proteomics (MCP) / American Society for Biochemistry and Molecular Biology (ASBMB) Lectureship Award
- 2019 inaugural winner of the US Human Proteome Organization Lifetime Achievement in Proteomics Award
- 2019 Analytical Scientist the Power List
- 2017 American Society for Mass Spectrometry John B. Fenn Award for a Distinguished Contribution in Mass Spectrometry
- 2016 American Association for the Advancement of Science Fellow
- 2015 Human Proteome Organization Distinguished Service Award
- 2015 German Mass Spectrometry Society (Deutsche Gesellschaft für Massenspektrometrie, DGMS) Wolfgang Paul Lecture
- 2013 Boston University The William Fairfield Warren Distinguished Professorship
- 2011 American Chemical Society Fellow
- 2010 American Chemical Society Frank H. Field and Joe L. Franklin Award for Outstanding Achievement in Mass Spectrometry
- 2009 International Mass Spectrometry Foundation Thomson Medal
- 2008 Human Proteome Organization Discovery in Proteomic Sciences Award

== Awards in her honor ==
- US Human Proteome Organization Catherine E. Costello Lifetime Achievement in Proteomics Award (from 2020)
- Females in Mass Spectrometry Catherine E. Costello Award (from 2020)
