= David E. Clemmer =

American chemist

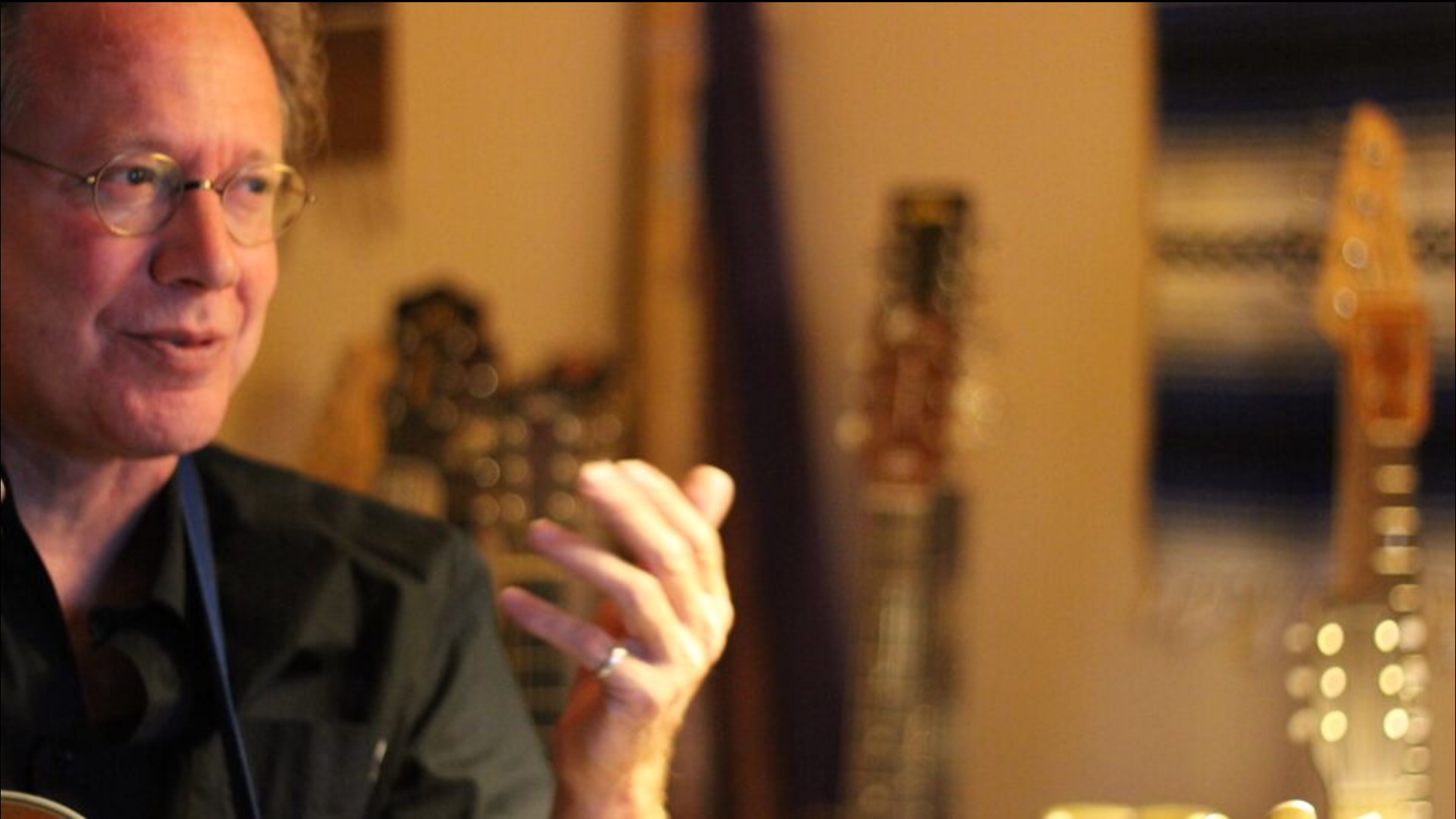
- Education: Adams State College; University of Utah
- Known for: Ion mobility spectrometry, mass spectrometry
- Awards: Biemann Medal, ACS Chemical Instrumentation Award
- Scientific career
- Fields: Analytical chemistry, mass spectrometry
- Workplaces: Indiana University Bloomington
- Doctoral advisor: Peter B. Armentrout
- Website: www.indiana.edu/~clemmer/home.htm

David E. Clemmer (February 23, 1965, Alamosa, Colorado) is an analytical chemist and the Distinguished Professor and Robert and Marjorie Mann Chair of Chemistry at Indiana University in Bloomington, Indiana, where he leads the Clemmer Group. Clemmer develops new scientific instruments for ion mobility mass spectrometry (IMS/MS), including the first instrument for nested ion-mobility time-of-flight mass spectrometry. He has received a number of awards, including the Biemann Medal in 2006 "for his pioneering contributions to the integration of ion mobility separations with a variety of mass spectrometry technologies."

== Early life and education ==
Clemmer was born on February 23, 1965, to Ed Clemmer, an artist, and his wife MaryAnn, a teacher, of Alamosa, Colorado. He attended Adams State College, where he originally majored in music, before changing to science. He received his B.S. in chemistry with honors in 1987. He then attended the University of Utah, receiving his Ph.D. in physical chemistry in 1992. His thesis advisor was Peter B. Armentrout, with whom he studied transition metal ions in gaseous reactions.

== Career ==
During 1992–1993, Clemmer was a postdoctoral fellow in Japan, supported by the Japan Society for the Promotion of Science Fellowship at the Himeji Institute of Technology. He worked with Kenji Honma on electron transfer mechanisms and reactions of excited-state metal atoms and gaseous molecules. From 1993 to 1995, Clemmer was a postdoctoral research associate at Northwestern University, where he worked with Martin F. Jarrold, studying protein folding and protein conformation in the gas phase, using techniques such as Ion-mobility spectrometry.

In 1995, Clemmer joined the Department of Chemistry at Indiana University. He served as chair of the Chemistry Department from 2002 to 2006. He is a full professor, and holds the Robert and Marjorie Mann Chair of Chemistry, to which he was named in 2002. He has published more than 230 papers.

Among those who have influenced him, he includes Michael T. Bowers, Jesse L. Beauchamp, R. Graham Cooks, Scott A. McLuckey, Fred McLafferty, Evan R. Williams, Joseph A. Loo, Vicki Wysocki, and Julie A. Leary. His graduate students have included Renã A. S. Robinson, Stephen Valentine, Cherokee Hoaglund-Hyzer, and Catherine Srebalus Barnes.

== Research ==
Drift tube for ion mobility spectrometry

Clemmer is particularly interested in studying the structural characterization and conformational dynamics of complex low-symmetry systems. Clemmer develops scientific instruments and methods for the examination of biomolecular structure and complex biomolecular mixtures in the gas phase using ion-mobility spectrometry.

Ion mobility methods separate ions into different groups based on their ability to move through an electrically charged buffer gas. This enables complex mixtures to be differentiated in ways that could not be achieved by mass spectrometry alone. Even minute amounts of compounds can be distinguished and differentially examined according to characteristics such as size, shape and charge as well as mass.

Clemmer has helped to establish ion mobility as both a powerful tool and a field of research through his "thorough studies" and "revolutionary instrumental methods". In early work, Clemmer and Jarrold used long drift tubes with non-clustering gas atmospheres to increase the resolving power of ion-mobility spectrometry. Clemmer's work on gas-phase separation methods for ion mobility-mass spectrometry (IM-MS) and their application to the structural analysis of intact proteins is considered a "particularly important milestone" in the application of IM-MS to the examination of biomolecular structures. Clemmer and his colleagues have developed at least a dozen different configurations combining modular components for ion-mobility with mass spectrometry instruments. These include combining ion mobility with Time-of-flight mass spectrometry (TOF). They also developed the first instrument for nested ion-mobility time-of-flight mass spectrometry.

Such equipment allows researchers to learn more about both the structures and the conformational dynamics of systems. Clemmer has identified fundamental relationships between charge states and structures, and has shown that a single charge state can exist in more than one conformation in gaseous states. Such techniques can be used for the study of both proteins and peptides. In early work, Clemmer showed that multiple conformations of the hemeprotein cytochrome c could be differentiated based on their mobilities. In addition, the mobility of different chiral isomers was related to their protein folding. More recent techniques enable researchers to track transitions in the conformations of macromolecular ions during the gas phase. A short pulse of ions is introduced into a drift tube by electrospray ionization. Structures separate based on differences in their mobilities. By exposing specific states to energizing collisions, new structures can be established and tracked through different conformational changes. Changes in conformation during the gas-phase data can then be mapped back to the original populations of structures. In this way, researchers can understand the possible pathways between structures.

Understanding how protein folding occurs in three-dimensional molecules is one of biology's enduring problems. Proteins with different shapes often have very different biological activity and medical usefulness. Clemmer's work has applications in the life sciences for understanding the conformation of structures in large protein complexes, profiling the plasma proteome, examining the role of proteins and protein folding in neurodegenerative diseases, identifying possible cancer-related markers in blood, urine, or saliva, and increasing the efficiency of drug-discovery. Ion mobility-mass spectrometry techniques also allow the measurement and correlation of a wide variety of different characteristics simultaneously in a single analysis. Researchers can use these techniques to examine complex biological samples for lipidomics, proteomics, glycomics, and metabolomics information.

== Companies ==
Clemmer is a co-founder of Beyond Genomics, a systems biology company, and the founder of Predictive Physiology and Medicine, a biotechnology company specializing in personalized medicine.

== Hobbies ==
In addition to playing several instruments, Clemmer enjoys running marathons.

== Awards and honors ==
- 2023, Field and Franklin Award for Outstanding Achievement in Mass Spectrometry
- 2022, Wylie Innovation Catalyst Medal
- 2020, Bicentennial Medal Award Winner
- 2018, John B. Fenn Distinguished Contribution, shared with Martin F. Jarrold and Gert von Helden, American Society for Mass Spectrometry
- 2017, Fellow, National Academy of Inventors
- 2014–2015, ANACHEM Award
- 2014, Distinguished Professor, Indiana University Bloomington
- 2014, Distinguished Chemistry Alumni, University of Utah
- 2012, American Chemical Society (ACS) Chemical Instrumentation Award
- 2011, Fellow, American Association for the Advancement of Science (AAAS)
- 2011–2012, Fellow, Japanese Society for the Promotion of Science (JSPS)
- 2010, Adams State Outstanding Alumnus
- 2009, Tracy M. Sonneborn Award, Indiana University Bloomington
- 2007, American Chemical Society (ACS) Akron award
- 2006, Biemann Medal, American Society for Mass Spectrometry
- 2005, Fellow, Royal Society of Chemistry
- 2003–2005, National Science Foundation Special Creativity Award
- 2002, Pittcon Achievement Award
- 2002, Named one of Popular Science's 10 Most Brilliant List
- 2002, named Robert and Marjorie Mann Chair of Chemistry, Indiana University Bloomington
- 2000–2002, Eli Lilly Analytical Chemistry Award
- 1998–2001, Fellow, Alfred P. Sloan Research
- 2000, National Fresenius Award, Phi Lambda Upsilon
- 1999–2000, American Chemical Society (ACS), Division of Analytical Chemistry, Arthur F. Findeis Award
- 1999, Camille Dreyfus Teacher-Scholar Award, The Camille and Henry Dreyfus Foundation
- 1999, "Innovators Under 35", MIT Technology Review
- 1996–2000, National Science Foundation Early Career Award
