= Lisa Jones (scientist) =

American biochemist

- Education: Syracuse University; Georgia State University
- Known for: Cell footprinting
- Scientific career
- Workplaces: University of California, San Diego; University of Maryland; Indiana University-Purdue University Indianapolis; Washington University in St. Louis; University of Alabama at Birmingham
- Thesis: Using Protein Design to Understand the Role of Electrostatic Interactions on Calcium Binding Affinity and Molecular Recognition (2008)
- Doctoral advisor: Jenny J. Yang
- Other academic advisors: Michael Gross
- Website: Official website

Lisa Michelle Jones (born February 1977) is an American professor of chemistry and biochemistry at the University of California, San Diego (UCSD). Her research is in structural proteomics, using mass spectrometry (MS) together with fast photochemical oxidation of proteins (FPOP), allowing researchers to study the solvent accessibility of proteins experimentally.

== Early life and education ==
Jones became interested in science as a freshman at high school, where she took part in a national Science Technology Engineering Program. She earned a BS in biochemistry at Syracuse University in 1999. Jones completed her PhD at Georgia State University and specialized in structural biology.

Jones received postdoctoral training in structural virology at the University of Alabama at Birmingham. She was a Pfizer postdoctoral researcher at Washington University in St. Louis working with Michael Gross on MS-based protein footprinting developed by Maleknia and co-workers in the late 1990s.

== Research and career ==
After her postdoctoral research, she joined Indiana University, where she became an associate professor. She moved to the University of Maryland School of Pharmacy in 2016. In her research, Jones focusses on structural proteomics, having developed fast photochemical oxidation of proteins (FPOP) which uses an excimer laser for photolysis, which generates hydroxyl radicals. Hydroxyl radicals go on to oxidise the side chains of amino acids and provide solvent accessibility of proteins within a cell. FPOP can provide information on the sites of ligand binding, protein interaction and protein conformational changes in vivo. More recently, her group has extended the platform with a no-flow platform for high-throughput in-cell measurements.

In 2019, she received the Biophysical Society's Junior Faculty Award.

Jones also works on science outreach and improving representation in the sciences. She is a mentor in the UMD CURE Scholars Program and a member of the American Society for Mass Spectrometry Diversity and Outreach Working Group. Jones is also co-director of the Initiative to Maximize Student Development (IMSD) Meyerhoff Graduate Fellowship Program, a program for increasing representation of minority students in STEM.

In 2021, Jones was in the news for turning down a faculty position at the University of North Carolina at Chapel Hill in protest of controversy regarding the tenure status of journalist Nikole Hannah-Jones.
