= Igor Kaltashov =

American chemist

Igor A. Kaltashov (Russian: Игорь Аркадьевич Калташёв) is an American chemist, who is active in the fields of mass spectrometry and biochemistry; he is an associate professor of the University of Massachusetts Amherst (UMass).

== Works ==
- Igor A. Kaltashov, Eyles S. J. Mass spectrometry in structural biology and biophysics : architecture, dynamics, and interaction of biomolecules. — 2nd ed. — Hoboken, NJ: Wiley, 2012. — 289 p. — ISBN 9781118232125. — ISBN 1118232127. — ISBN 9781118232088. — ISBN 1118232089. — ISBN 9781280590283.

== Awards ==
- Research Award - American Society for Mass Spectrometry (ASMS); Thermo Fisher Scientific, Waters Corporation (2000).

== Literature ==
- Rachel Brazil: Mass Spectrometry in Biopharmaceutical Discovery // Technology Networks, May 29, 2018.

== Web-sources ==
- "Igor Kaltashov, Professor in Chemistry: Analytical, Bioanalytical, Biological". Department of Chemistry, University of Massachusetts Amherst.
- "Research Awards". American Society for Mass Spectrometry (ASMS).
- М. С. Гельфанд, М. В. Фейгельман, Г. А. Цирлина, Б. Е. Штерн (2018-08-24). "Калташев Игорь Аркадьевич: Massachusetts U" (in Russian). Корпус экспертов по естественным наукам.
