= Hilkka I. Kenttämaa =

Finnish-born chemist and professor

Hilkka Kenttämaa
- Education: University of Helsinki(BS MS Phil.Lic. PhD)
- Awards: Frank H. Field and Joe L. Franklin ACS Award for Outstanding Achievement in Mass Spectrometry(2015)
- Scientific career
- Fields: Chemistry
- Workplaces: Purdue University
- Thesis: Unimolecular Gas Phase Reactions of Some Organophosphorus Ester Ions and Effects of Stepwise Collisional Excitation (1986)

Hilkka Inkeri Kenttämaa is a researcher in organic and bioorganic mass spectrometry, and the Frank Brown Endowed Distinguished Professor of Chemistry at Purdue University. She is a pioneer in distonic radical cation research and laser-induced acoustic desorption.

== Early life and education ==
Kenttämaa had initially planned to study mathematics, instead of chemistry, despite both her parents being chemists. She studied at Helsinki University, earning a BS in 1977, a MS in 1978, a Phil. Lic.in 1981, and a PhD in Organic Chemistry in 1986. She did post-doctoral research with R. Graham Cooks at Purdue University in 1986.

== Career ==
She began her career as a research scientist at Helsinki University, the Academy of Finland, and as a visiting research scientist at Purdue University. She joined the faculty at Purdue University in 1989, and was promoted to Full Professor in 1999. Her projects include using tandem mass spectrometry to study reaction mechanisms and fast pyrolysis process. She is a pioneer in distonic radical cation research and laser-induced acoustic desorption.

She was elected as a member of the Finish Academy of Science in 2004. She serves as a subject editor in basic mass spectrometry for Mass Spectrometry Reviews.

== Honors and awards ==
- 1991 American Society for Mass Spectrometry Young Investigator Research Award
- 1996 National Science Foundation Career Advancement Award in the Organic Dynamics Program of the Chemistry Division
- 2009 Purdue University Provost's Award for Outstanding Graduate Faculty Mentor
- 2013 Purdue University Leadership Award of the College of Science
- 2015 American Chemical Society the Frank H. Field and Joe L. Franklin Award for Outstanding Achievement in Mass Spectrometry
- 2015 Purdue University Foundation Innovators Hall of Fame
- 2016 Fellow of the American Association for the Advancement of Science
- 2016 the Analytical Scientist The Power List 2016 the Top 50 Most Influential Women in the Analytical Sciences
- 2020 NASA Engineering and Safety Center Group Achievement Award, as part of the Transient Combustion Modeling for Hypergolic Engines Assessment Team

== Selected publications ==
Below is a list of articles co-authored by Kenttämaa, with over 100 citations:

- Vicki H. Wysocki; Hilkka I. Kenttämaa; R. Graham Cooks (1987) "Internal energy distributions of isolated ions after activation by various methods". International Journal of Mass Spectrometry and Ion Processes 75 (2): 181–208.
- Krista M. Stirk; L. K. Marjatta Kiminkinen; Hilkka I. Kenttamaa (1992) "Ion-molecule reactions of distonic radical cations". Chemical Reviews 92 (7):1649–1665.
- David S. Pinkston; Penggao Duan; Vanessa A. Gallardo; Steven C. Habicht; Xiaoli Tan; Kuangnan Qian; Murray Gray; Klaus Müllen; Hilkka I. Kenttämaa (2009) "Analysis of asphaltenes and asphaltene model compounds by laser-induced acoustic desorption/Fourier transform ion cyclotron resonance mass spectrometry". Energy Fuels 23 (11): 5564–5570.
- David Borton, II; David S. Pinkston; Matthew R. Hurt; Xiaoli Tan; Khalid Azyat; Alexander Scherer; Rik Tykwinski; Murray Gray; Kuangnan Qian; Hilkka I. Kenttämaa (2010) "Molecular structures of asphaltenes based on the dissociation reactions of their ions in mass spectrometry". Energy Fuels 24 (10): 5548–5559.
- Trenton H. Parsell; Benjamin C. Owen; Ian Klein; Tiffany M. Jarrell; Christopher L. Marcum; Laura J. Haupert; Lucas M. Amundson; Hilkka I. Kenttämaa; Fabio Ribeiro; Jeffrey T. Miller; Mahdi M. Abu-Omar (2013) "Cleavage and hydrodeoxygenation (HDO) of C–O bonds relevant to lignin conversion using Pd/Zn synergistic catalysis". Chemical Science 4 (2): 806–813.
- Trenton Parsell; Sara Yohe; John Degenstein; Tiffany Jarrell; Ian Klein; Emre Gencer; Barron Hewetson; Matt Hurt; Jeong Im Kim; Harshavardhan Choudhari; Basudeb Saha; Richard Meilan; Nathan Mosier; Fabio Ribeiro; W. Nicholas Delgass; Clint Chapple; Hilkka I. Kenttämaa; Rakesh Agrawal; Mahdi M. Abu-Omar (2015) "A synergistic biorefinery based on catalytic conversion of lignin prior to cellulose starting from lignocellulosic biomass". Green Chemistry 17 (3): 1492–1499.
- Hao Luo; Ian M. Klein; Yuan Jiang; Hanyu Zhu; Baoyuan Liu; Hilkka I. Kenttämaa; Mahdi M. Abu-Omar (2016) "Total utilization of miscanthus biomass, lignin and carbohydrates, using earth abundant nickel catalyst". ACS Sustainable Chemistry & Engineering 4 (4): 2316–2322.

Book chapter

- Kawthar Z. Alzarieni; Hilkka I. Kenttämaa. "The distillation precipitation fractionation mass spectrometry (DPF-MS) method for molecular profiling of crude oil" in The Chemistry of Oil and Petroleum Products. Merv Fingas (Ed.). De Gruyter 2022.

== Patent applications ==
- High power laser induced acoustic desorption probe (2007) US 7619217 B2
- Laser-induced acoustic desorption/atmospheric pressure chemical ionization of compounds(2011) US 8344319 B2
- Sample deposition chamber for laser-induced acoustic desorption (liad) foils (2012) WO 2013103417 A3
- Differentially pumped dual linear quadrupole ion trap mass spectrometer (2015) US 9496127 B2
- Multichannel Pulsed Valve Inlet System (2019) US
