= Robert J. Cotter =

American scientist

- Born: July 15, 1943; Washington, D.C., U.S.
- Died: November 12, 2012 (aged 69); Baltimore, Maryland, U.S.
- Education: College of the Holy Cross (BS); Johns Hopkins University (PhD)
- Known for: Time-of-flight mass spectrometry
- Spouse: Catherine Clarke Fenselau
- Awards: Field and Franklin Award (2011); ASMS Distinguished Contribution in Mass Spectrometry Award (2011)
- Scientific career
- Fields: Mass spectrometry
- Workplaces: Towson University; Gettysburg College; Johns Hopkins University
- Doctoral advisor: W.S. Koski

Robert J. Cotter (July 15, 1943 – November 12, 2012) was an American chemist and mass spectrometrist. His research contributed to many early advances in the field of time-of-flight mass spectrometry. From 1998 to 2000 he was president of the American Society for Mass Spectrometry. Cotter was also a co-investigator on the Mars Organic Molecule Analyzer (MOMA) project, developing a miniaturized, low power consumption ion trap/time-of-flight mass spectrometer that was to be deployed with the ExoMars rover, now the Rosalind Franklin rover.

== Early life and education ==
Cotter was raised in Abington, Massachusetts, and was the oldest of seven children. After graduating from Boston College High School in 1961, he attended the College of the Holy Cross in Worcester, Massachusetts, and graduated from Holy Cross with a Bachelor of Science in 1965. He then pursued graduate studies at Johns Hopkins University under W.S. Koski, earning his Ph.D. in 1972. After receiving his doctorate, he joined the faculty of Towson University and Gettysburg College.

== Academic research career ==
From 1978 until his death in 2012, Robert Cotter was a member of the faculty at Johns Hopkins University in the departments of Pharmacology and Molecular Sciences and Biophysics and Biophysical Chemistry.

=== Curved-field reflectron ===
To increase the mass resolution in time-of-flight mass spectrometry, a reflectron is often employed. Traditional, single-stage or linear reflectrons suffered from a lack of sensitivity and resolving power when ion velocities (and thus kinetic energies were not equal. In MALDI mass spectrometry, metastable ions generated spontaneously after ionization (post-source decay) exhibit a wide spectrum of kinetic energies. This is also known to occur during collision-induced dissociation. In 1993, Cotter's research group discovered that, using a non-linear electric field, the spread of ion kinetic energies could be compensated, increasing the resolution of time-of-flight mass spectrometers and forming the basis for many modern TOF/TOF mass spectrometers.

=== Ionization and biological mass spectrometry ===
While he is primarily known for his contributions to the field of time-of-flight mass spectrometry, his research in the development and application of new ionization techniques for complex biomolecules. These include thermal desorption, laser desorption, fast atom bombardment, thermospray and plasma desorption.

His research into ionization sources also enabled many other discoveries in biomedical sciences. In 1993, he was part of the research team responsible for implicating the 42 amino acid form of the protein Aβ in the pathology of Alzheimer's disease.

=== Mars organic molecule analyzer ===
The Mars Organic Molecule Analyzer (MOMA) project is part of a collaboration to search for potential signatures of Martian life. Cotter was a deputy principal investigator and responsible for the design and development of a low-power, ion trap-time-of-flight mass spectrometer to be deployed with the ESA ExoMars rover. However, in February 2012, NASA cancelled its participation in the rover and defunded projects related to it. By November 2012 NASA reestablished the funding for the US part of MOMA.
