= Tara Pukala =

Australian biological chemist

- Education: University of Adelaide
- Occupation: Biological chemist
- Employer: University of Adelaide
- Known for: Biological chemistry
- Title: Professor
- Website: https://www.pukalalab.org/

Tara Louise Pukala is an Australian scientist who is a professor of biological chemistry at the University of Adelaide, board member of Nature Scientific Reports, Superstar of STEM, 2023–2024, and Director of the Adelaide Proteomics Centre.

== Education and career ==
Pukala was awarded a PhD from the University of Adelaide in 2006 for her thesis "Structural and mechanistic studies of bioactive peptides". She then moved to the University of Cambridge in a post-doctoral role, researching native mass spectrometry. Since 2017, she has been the director of the Adelaide Proteomics Centre, leading a multidisciplinary group of researchers.

Pukala is a member of the editorial board for Analytical Chemistry, and an associate editor for Frontiers in Chemistry (Medicinal and Pharmaceutical Chemistry). She is also associate editor of Rapid Communications in Mass Spectrometry, editor of the European Journal of Mass Spectrometry, and a board member of Nature Scientific Reports. She was also vice-president of the Australian and New Zealand Society for Mass Spectrometry (ANZSMS).

Pukala's research involves the intersection of chemistry and biology, working with molecular proteins, including DNA and other biomolecules. She is interested in visualising the structures, shapes, and ways that various biomolecules interact with each other. This research helps with understanding medical and health sciences, and the mechanistic biological and chemical processes.

== Awards ==
- 2017 – Australian and New Zealand Society of Mass Spectrometry Bowie Medal.
- 2021 – Faculty of Sciences Mid Career Research Excellence Award.
- 2022 – Superstar of STEM, Science Technology, Australia.

== Selected publications ==
- Pukala, Tara L.; Bowie, John H.; Maselli, Vita M.; Musgrave, Ian F.; Tyler, Michael J. (2006-06-01). "Host-defence peptides from the glandular secretions of amphibians: structure and activity". Natural Product Reports. 23 (3): 368–393. doi:10.1039/B512118N. ISSN 1460-4752.
- Pukala, Tara; Robinson, Carol V. (2022-04-27). "Introduction: Mass Spectrometry Applications in Structural Biology". Chemical Reviews. 122 (8): 7267–7268. doi:10.1021/acs.chemrev.2c00085. ISSN 0009-2665.
