= Amanda Paulovich =

Oncologist

- Education: Carnegie Mellon University; University of Washington
- Awards: HUPO Distinguished Achievement in Proteomic Sciences Award (2015)
- Scientific career
- Fields: Biology
- Workplaces: Fred Hutchinson Cancer Research Center
- Thesis: The Regulation of S Phase Progression Rate in Yeast in Response to DNA Damage (1996)
- Doctoral advisor: Leland H. Hartwell

Amanda Grace Paulovich is an oncologist, and a pioneer in proteomics using multiple reaction monitoring mass spectrometry to study tailored cancer treatment.

== Education ==
Paulovich received a BS in Biological Sciences from Carnegie Mellon University in 1988, a PhD in Genetics from University of Washington in 1996, under the direction of Leland Hartwell. She also received a MD from University of Washington in 1998. Follow her residency in Internal Medicine at Massachusetts General Hospital, she also completed a Postdoctoral Fellowship in Computational Biology at the Massachusetts Institute of Technology Whitehead Center for Genomic Research in 2003, and a Fellowship in Medical Oncology at the Dana Farber Cancer Institute in 2004.

== Career ==
Paulovich is a Professor in Clinical Research, an Aven Foundation Endowed Chair, and the Director of Early Detection Initiative at the Fred Hutchinson Cancer Research Center. She was inducted to the American Society for Clinical Inviestigation in 2012.

Paulovich is an expert in proteomics. Her targeted proteomics method uses multiple reaction monitoring mass spectrometry to target cancer biomarkers with ongoing clinical trials, and was named Method of the Year in 2012 by Nature Methods. She founded Precision Assays in 2016, whose rights to targeted assays were acquired by CellCarta in 2022.

== Awards ==
- 2014 Life Science Innovation Northwest Woman to Watch in Life Science Award
- 2015 Human Proteome Organization (HUPO) Distinguished Achievement in Proteomic Sciences Award

== Patent applications ==
- Identification and use of biomarkers for detection and quantification of the level of radiation exposure in a biological sample (2011) US 20130052668 A1
- Compositions and methods for reliably detecting and/or measuring the amount of a modified target protein in a sample (2011) US 20130052669 A1
