= Anne-Claude Gingras =

- Born: Île d'Orléans, Quebec, Canada
- Education: Université Laval; McGill University
- Known for: Quantitative proteomics
- Scientific career
- Workplaces: Lunenfeld-Tanenbaum Research Institute; University of Toronto

Anne-Claude Gingras FRSC is a senior investigator at Lunenfeld-Tanenbaum Research Institute, and a professor in the department of molecular genetics at the University of Toronto. She is an expert in mass spectrometry based proteomics technology that allows identification and quantification of protein from various biological samples.

== Biography ==
Gingras was born on Île d'Orléans, Quebec. She earned her undergraduate degree at Université Laval in Quebec. She completed her PhD in biochemistry at McGill University in Montreal, studying how 4E-BP1 regulated translation initiation, under the mentorship of Nahum Sonenberg. After graduating in 2001, she began postdoctoral research in Seattle at the Institute for Systems Biology in the lab of Ruedi Aebersold, where she studied proteomics for three years.

In 2005, Gingras moved to Toronto and joined the Lunenfeld-Tanenbaum Research Institute, and in 2006, she began teaching at the University of Toronto in the department of molecular genetics.

== Career ==
Gingras research focuses on the development of experimental and bioinformatics approaches for functional proteomics, with a focus on protein-protein and proximity interactions. She applies these tools to the study of signaling pathways in health and disease and in mapping the physical organization of the dynamic proteome. Some of her work focuses on the consequence of disease-associated mutations on the interactions established by proteins.

In addition to proteomics, Gingras laboratory has interest in studying human protein phosphatase and their systematic interactions and has now expanded into the field of systems biology.

== Achievements and awards ==
Gingras has published > 200 articles that have been cited > 35,000 times (Google Scholar; Feb 2020). In 2011, Gingras was named one of Canada's Top 100 Most Powerful Women. In 2015, Gingras was elected a fellow of the Royal Society of Canada. Her work on interaction proteomics, was awarded, alongside John Yates, the Discovery Award in Proteomics from the Human Proteome Organization (2019). She also received the Jeanne Manery Fisher Memorial Lecture award at the 2019 meeting of the Canadian Society for Molecular Biosciences.

== Selected publications ==
- Gingras, Anne-Claude; Raught, Brian; Sonenberg, Nahum (1999-06-01). "eIF4 Initiation Factors: Effectors of mRNA Recruitment to Ribosomes and Regulators of Translation". Annual Review of Biochemistry. 68 (1): 913–963.
- Sonenberg, Nahum; Lawrence, John C.; Lin, Tai-An; Donzé, Olivier; Gingras, Anne-Claude; Belsham, Graham J.; Pause, Arnim (1994-10). "Insulin-dependent stimulation of protein synthesis by phosphorylation of a regulator of 5'-cap function". Nature. 371 (6500): 762–767.
- Sonenberg, Nahum; Raught, Brian; Gingras, Anne-Claude (2001-04-01). "Regulation of translation initiation by FRAP/mTOR". Genes & Development. 15(7): 807–826.
- Sonenberg, Nahum; Aebersold, Ruedi; Hoekstra, Merl F.; Abraham, Robert T.; Polakiewicz, Roberto D.; Raught, Brian; Gygi, Steven P.; Gingras, Anne-Claude (1999-06-01). "Regulation of 4E-BP1 phosphorylation: a novel two-step mechanism". Genes & Development. 13 (11): 1422–1437.
- Hay, Nissim; Sonenberg, Nahum; O’Leary, Maura A.; Kennedy, Scott G.; Gingras, Anne-Claude (1998-02-15). "4E-BP1, a repressor of mRNA translation, is phosphorylated and inactivated by the Akt(PKB) signaling pathway". Genes & Development. 12 (4): 502–513.
- Sonenberg, Nahum; Aebersold, Ruedi; Wyslouch-Cieszynska, Aleksandra; Polakiewicz, Roberto D.; Burley, Stephen K.; Miron, Mathieu; Niedzwiecka, Anna; Gygi, Steven P.; Raught, Brian (2001-11-01). "Hierarchical phosphorylation of the translation inhibitor 4E-BP1". Genes & Development. 15 (21): 2852–2864.
- Sonenberg, Nahum; Gingras, Anne-Claude; Raught, Brian (2001-06-19). "The target of rapamycin (TOR) proteins". Proceedings of the National Academy of Sciences. 98 (13): 7037–7044.
