= Karin Rodland =

Cancer cell biologist

Karin D. Rodland
- Born: 1949 (age 76–77)
- Education: Syracuse University
- Known for: cancer cell biology
- Scientific career
- Fields: proteomics, systems biology
- Workplaces: Pacific Northwest National Laboratory; Oregon Health & Science University
- Thesis: A comparative study of thermoregulatory responses to acute heat stress in three rodent species. (1974)

Karin Dorinda Norlin Rodland (born 1949) is an American cancer cell biologist. She is a professor emeritus at Oregon Health and Science University.

== Education ==
Rodland earned an A.B. from Hood College in 1970, and a PhD in biology from Syracuse University in 1974. She also completed her post-doctoral research at Syracuse with a National Cancer Institute Public Health Service Research Service Award.

== Career ==
Rodland began her academic career at Reed College in 1979, then Oregon Health and Science University School of Medicine in 1985. She was named a laboratory fellow at the U.S. Pacific Northwest National Laboratory, and a professor emeritus in Cell, Developmental and Cancer Biology, at Oregon Health and Science University School of Medicine. She retired in June 2020.

Rodland serves on the board of directors for the U.S. Human Proteome Organization, the editorial board of Cancer Biomarkers and Cancer Genomics and Proteomics, and on the Leadership Development Committee of the Federation of American Societies for Experimental Biology. She was appointed to the Board of Directors of the Andy Hill Cancer Research Endowment (CARE) Fund by Washington State Governor Jay Inslee in 2022 and served through June 2024.

== Awards ==
- 2021 U.S. Pacific Northwest National Laboratory Lab Director's Award for Lifetime Achievement in Science or Technology
- 2020 Human Proteome Organization Distinguished Achievement in Proteomic Sciences Award
- 2019 Northwest Section of the Ninety-Nines Spinning Prop Award
- 2011 Fellow of the American Association for the Advancement of Science
- 2008 Laboratory Fellow of the U.S. Pacific Northwest National Laboratory
- 2006 Northwest Section of the Ninety-Nines Spinning Prop Award

== Selected publications ==
- Mass Spectrometry and Biomarkers Development, Karin D. Rodland (Ed.), IOS Press, 2004.
- Hui Zhang et al. (2016) "Integrated Proteogenomic Characterization of Human High-Grade Serous Ovarian Cancer", Cell 166 (3): 755–765
- Suhas Vasaikar et al. (2019) "Proteogenomic Analysis of Human Colon Cancer Reveals New Therapeutic Opportunities", Cell 177 (4): 1035–1049.e19
- Systems Biology of Biomarkers, Karin D. Rodland (Ed.), IOS Press, 2020.
