= Michael L. Gross (chemist) =

American chemist

- Born: 1940 (age 85–86)
- Education: University of Minnesota; College of Saint Benedict and Saint John's University
- Known for: mass spectrometry
- Scientific career
- Fields: Chemistry
- Workplaces: Washington University in St. Louis; University of Nebraska–Lincoln

Michael L. Gross (born 1940) is Professor of Chemistry, Medicine, and Immunology, at Washington University in St. Louis and at Washington University School of Medicine. He was formerly Professor of Chemistry at University of Nebraska–Lincoln from 1968–1994. He is recognized for his contributions to the field of mass spectrometry and ion chemistry. He is credited with the discovery of distonic ions, chemical species containing a radical and an ionic site on different atoms of the same molecule.

== Career ==
Working with colleagues at the Environmental Protection Agency, he validated the part-per-trillion analysis of 2378-tetrachlorodibenzodioxin in biological tissues, perhaps the first validation of an ultra-trace analytical chemistry method. With this method, he and his coworkers found this highly toxic compound in the tissue of veterans of the Vietnam War, a controversial observation that was later validated by scientists at the Center for Disease Control.

In 1978, he became Director of a National Science Foundation Center for Mass Spectrometry at Nebraska. Under the aegis of the NSF, he commissioned the first commercial triple sector tandem mass spectrometer. With this instrumentation, his coworkers and he sequenced the first unknown peptide using soft ionization and tandem mass spectrometry (MS/MS). They also discovered a new class of fragmentation of gas-phase ions later termed "charge-remote fragmentation." and applied it to a wide variety of compounds including fatty acids, lipids, surfactants, steroids, and peptides. An expanded four-sector version was employed to insert noble gas atoms in C-60 and other fullerenes and a second noble gas atom in synthetic fullerenes already containing a noble gas atom.

In the late 1970s, Charles Wilkins and Gross built the second Fourier transform ion cyclotron resonance mass spectrometer and were the first to use it for analytical applications. Notable were the demonstrations of GC/MS, laser desorption, gas pulsing, multiphoton ionization, and the development of calibration law for accurate mass measurement. More recently, Don Rempel and he described an electrically compensated FTICR trap to improve mass resolving power.

Gross currently works on structural proteomics where he uses mass spectrometry in developing and implementing new approaches to protein footprinting, hydrogen/deuterium exchange, crosslinking and native MS. He applies these to problems in biochemistry and biophysics, often in collaboration with other investigators.

== Education, awards, editing ==
Gross received his B.A. from Saint John's University, Minnesota (1962), and his Ph.D. from the University of Minnesota (1966). He was a postdoctoral fellow at the University of Pennsylvania (ER Thornton) and Purdue University (FW McLafferty). For his research contributions, he received the Field and Franklin Award, American Chemical Society (1999), the Midwest Award, ACS (2002), and the JJ Thomson Medal of the Int'l Foundation for Mass Spectrometry (2006), Fellow of AAAS (2017), Analytical Chemistry Award of the American Chemical Society (2018), and the John Fenn Award of the American Society for Mass Spectrometry (2020). He is co-editor of the Encyclopedia of Mass Spectrometry and was editor-in-chief of the Journal of the American Society for Mass Spectrometry since its founding in 1990 through 2015. Prior to that appointment, he served as editor of Mass Spectrometry Reviews.

== Publications ==
Gross has authored and coauthored over 700 papers and book chapters. He was recognized as 50 Most Cited Chemists Institute for Scientific Information, 1984-1991. He was recognized in 2010 as the 356th most cited of living chemists.

== Books ==
- Ed., High Performance Mass Spectrometry: Chemical Applications, American Chemical Society Symposium Series, 70, 1978, 358 pp.
- Ed., Mass Spectrometry in the Biological Sciences: A Tutorial, Kluwer Academic Publishers, Dordrecht, 1992, 451 pp.
- Joint Ed., Biological Mass Spectrometry Present and Future, John Wiley & Sons, Ltd., Chichester, 653 pp.
- Joint Ed., Applied Electrospray Mass Spectrometry, Marcel Dekker, Inc., New York, 2002, 434 pp.
- Joint Ed., "Biological Applications. Part A: Peptides and Proteins," Encyclopedia of Mass Spectrometry, Vol 2, Elsevier, 2005, 435 pp.
- Joint Ed., Ionization Methods, Encyclopedia of Mass Spectrometry, Vol 6, Elsevier, 2007, 1007 pp.
