= Paola Picotti =

Italian biologist and academic

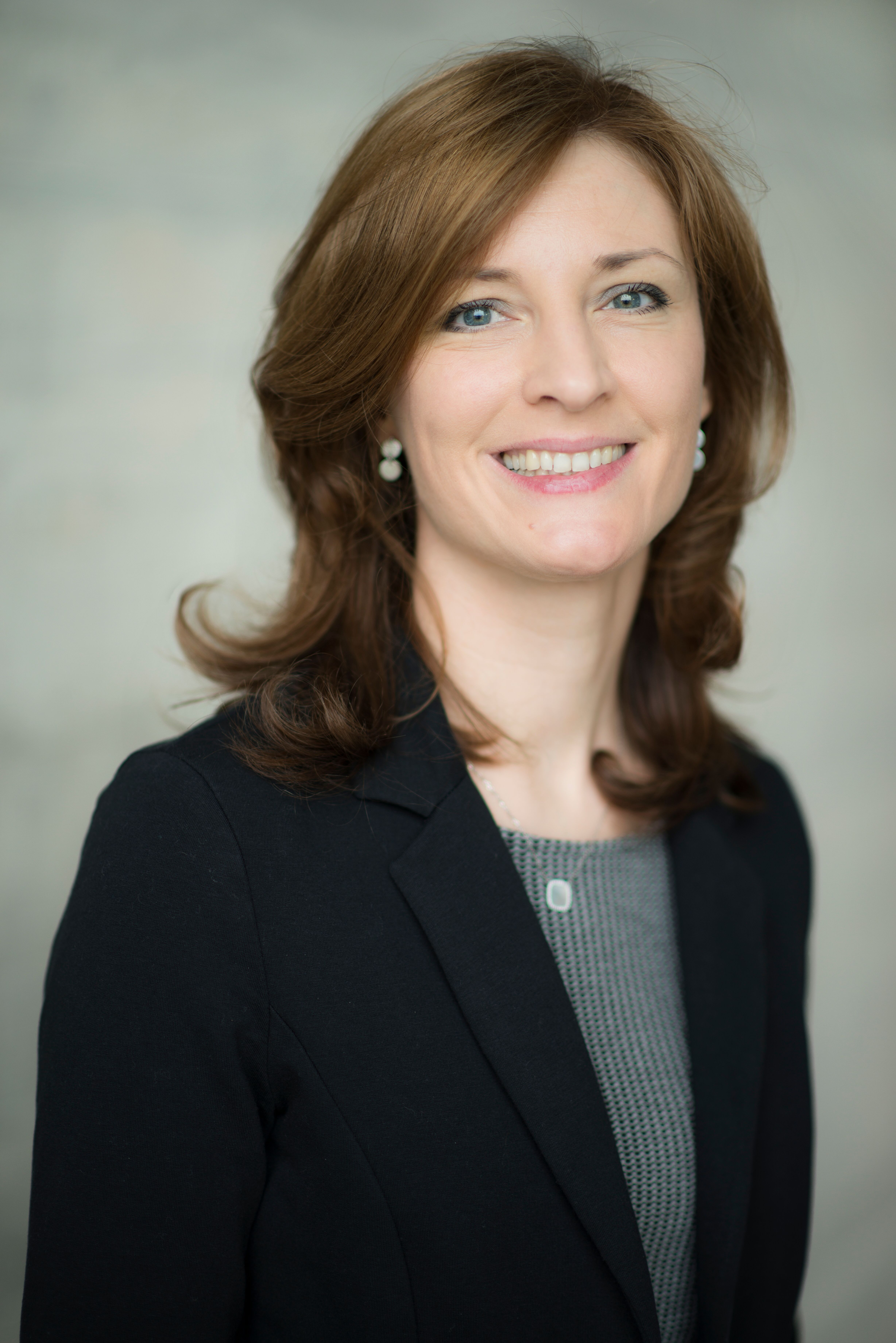
- Paola Picotti (2023)
- Born: Udine
- Education: University of Padua
- Awards: EMBO Gold Medal (2019)
- Scientific career
- Fields: Proteomics; Systems biology Protein aggregation Mass spectrometry
- Workplaces: ETH Zürich
- Website: imsb.ethz.ch/research/picotti/PeoplePicotti/paola-picotti.html

Paola Picotti (born 1977) is an Italian biochemist who is Professor for Molecular Systems Biology at ETH Zürich. She is Deputy Head of the Institute for Molecular Systems Biology. Her research investigates how the conformational changes of proteins impact molecular networks with cells. She received numerous awarded awards, among which the 2019 EMBO Gold Medal.

== Early life and education ==
Picotti grew up in Udine. Her mother was a mathematics teacher and her father worked in an electronics company. Picotti studied medicinal chemistry at the University of Padua, and graduated in 2001. She then moved into biotechnology, working alongside Angelo Fontana for her doctoral research. She joined the laboratory of Ruedi Aebersold as a postdoctoral fellow in the Institute for Molecular Systems Biology at ETH Zürich, where she developed approaches for the targeted analysis of proteins based on mass spectrometry. She was appointed a scientific advisor at Aebersold's spin-out company Biognosys.

== Research and career ==
In 2011, Picotti was appointed to the faculty at ETH Zürich, first as an assistant professor at the Institute of Biochemistry and subsequently as an associate and full professor at the Institute of Molecular Systems Biology. She works in the field of mass spectrometry-based proteomics, the large-scale analysis of thousands of proteins from cells and tissues. Whilst proteomics offers the potential for wide-reaching analysis, detail on the structures or shapes of proteins is lost in the process. Picotti developed an approach that solves this problem, since it enables the analysis of the structures of thousands of proteins simultaneously. It combines limited proteolysis and mass spectrometry (so-called "LiP-MS" method), to generate a proteolytic pattern (akin to a barcode) that reports on the structure of every measurable protein in a sample. Comparison of structural barcodes from different biological specimens (e.g. samples from healthy individuals and from individuals with a disease) detects which proteins have altered structures in those specimens. Picotti has shown that this technique can be used to identify a new class of candidate biomarkers of disease (structural biomarkers), unravel basic principles of thermosensitivity of proteins and provide a new and often more sensitive way to detect altered biological processes. Also, since binding of a small molecule locally affects the structure of a protein, the approach can be used to identify targets of small molecules and drugs, binding mechanisms and binding sites, thus rendering LiP-MS a valuable tool in drug development. Picotti uses LiP-MS to study protein aggregation in neurodegenerative disease, with a focus on Parkinson’s disease.

=== Awards and honours ===
- 2011 ETH Latsis Prize
- 2014 The Analytical Scientist's Top 40 under 40
- 2014 European Research Council Starting Grant
- 2016 EMBO Young Investigator Award
- 2016 Human Proteome Organization Robert J. Cotter Award
- 2017 Swiss Society for Molecular and Cellular Biosciences Friedrich-Miescher Award
- 2018 European Proteomics Association Juan Pablo Albar Protein Pioneer Award
- 2019 EMBO Gold Medal
- 2019 European Research Council Consolidator Grant
- 2020 Rössler Prize
- 2020 Elected to the German National Academy of Sciences Leopoldina
- 2021 Human Proteome Organization Discovery in Proteomics Award
- 2021 Falling Walls Award for Life Sciences
- 2022 EMBO Membership

=== Selected publications ===
- Vinzenz Lange; Paola Picotti; Bruno Domon; Ruedi Aebersold (2008). "Selected reaction monitoring for quantitative proteomics: a tutorial". Molecular Systems Biology. 4: 222. doi:10.1038/msb.2008.61. PMC 2583086. PMID 18854821. Wikidata Q36973024.
- Paola Picotti; Ruedi Aebersold (2012). "Selected reaction monitoring-based proteomics: workflows, potential, pitfalls and future directions". Nature Methods. 9 (6): 555–566. doi:10.1038/nmeth.2015. PMID 22669653. Wikidata Q34279143.
- Picotti, Paola; Clément-Ziza, Mathieu; Lam, Henry; Campbell, David S.; Schmidt, Alexander; Deutsch, Eric W.; Röst, Hannes; Sun, Zhi; Rinner, Oliver; Reiter, Lukas; Shen, Qin; Michaelson, Jacob J.; Frei, Andreas; Alberti, Simon; Kusebauch, Ulrike; Wollscheid, Bernd; Moritz, Robert L.; Beyer, Andreas; Aebersold, Ruedi (2013-01-20). "A complete mass-spectrometric map of the yeast proteome applied to quantitative trait analysis". Nature. 494 (7436): 266–270. Bibcode:2013Natur.494..266P. doi:10.1038/nature11835. PMC 3951219. PMID 23334424.
- Feng, Yuehan; De Franceschi, Giorgia; Kahraman, Abdullah; Soste, Martin; Melnik, Andre; Boersema, Paul J; de Laureto, Patrizia Polverino; Nikolaev, Yaroslav; Oliveira, Ana Paula; Picotti, Paola (2014-09-14). "Global analysis of protein structural changes in complex proteomes". Nature Biotechnology. 32 (10): 1036–1044. doi:10.1038/nbt.2999. PMID 25218519.
- Roger Geiger; Jan C Rieckmann; Tobias Wolf; et al. (2016). "L-Arginine Modulates T Cell Metabolism and Enhances Survival and Anti-tumor Activity". Cell. 167 (3): 829-842.e13. doi:10.1016/j.cell.2016.09.031. PMC 5075284. PMID 27745970. Wikidata Q37359052.
- Leuenberger, Pascal; Ganscha, Stefan; Kahraman, Abdullah; Cappelletti, Valentina; Boersema, Paul J; von Mering, Christian; Claassen, Manfred; Picotti, Paola (2017-02-24). "Cell-wide analysis of protein thermal unfolding reveals determinants of thermostability". Science. 355 (2637) eaai7825. doi:10.1126/science.aai7825. PMID 28232526.
- Piazza, Ilaria; Kochanowski, Karl; Cappelletti, Valentina; Fuhrer, Tobias; Noor, Elad; Sauer, Uwe; Picotti, Paola (2018-01-11). "A Map of Protein-Metabolite Interactions Reveals Principles of Chemical Communication". Cell. 172 (1–2): 358–372.e23. doi:10.1016/j.cell.2017.12.006. PMID 29307493.
- Mackmull, Marie-Therese; Nagel, Luise; Sesterhenn, Fabian; Muntel, Jan; Grossbach, Jan; Stalder, Patrick; Bruderer, Roland; Reiter, Lukas; van de Berg, Wilma D. J.; de Souza, Natalie; Beyer, Andreas; Picotti, Paola (2022-10-12). "Global, in situ analysis of the structural proteome in individuals with Parkinson's disease to identify a new class of biomarker". Nature Structural & Molecular Biology. 29 (10): 978–989. doi:10.1038/s41594-022-00837-0. PMID 36224378.
- Cappelletti, Valentina; Hauser, Thomas; Piazza, Ilaria; Pepelnjak, Monika; Malinovska, Liliana; Fuhrer, Tobias; Li, Yaozong; Dörig, Christian; Boersema, Paul; Gille, Ludovic; Grossbach, Jan; Dugourd, Aurelien; Saez-Rodriguez, Julio; Beyer, Andreas; Zamboni, Nicola; Caflisch, Amedeo; de Souza, Natalie; Picotti, Paola (2020-12-23). "Dynamic 3D proteomes reveal protein functional alterations at high resolution in situ". Cell. 184 (2): 545–559.e22. doi:10.1016/j.cell.2020.12.021. PMC 7836100. PMID 33357446.
