= Ying Ge =

Chinese-American biologist

- Education: Cornell University; University of Peking
- Scientific career
- Workplaces: University of Wisconsin-Madison; Wyeth
- Thesis: Top down characterization of proteins by electron capture dissociation and blackbody infrared radiative dissociation mass spectrometry (2002)

Ying Ge is a Chinese-American chemist who is a Professor of Cell and Regenerative Biology at the University of Wisconsin–Madison. Her research considers the molecular mechanisms that underpin cardiac disease. She has previously served on the board of directors of the American Society for Mass Spectrometry. In 2020 Ge was named on the Analytical Scientist Power List.

== Early life and education ==
Ge was born in China. She attended Peking University for her undergraduate studies, where she studied chemistry. After graduating in 1997 Ge moved to the United States, where she joined Cornell University as a doctoral student. Here she started to work on mass spectrometry, using electron-capture dissociation to study proteins. She worked under the supervision of Tadhg Begley and Fred McLafferty. After completing her doctorate, Ge worked as a research scientist at Wyeth.

== Research and career ==
Ge joined the University of Wisconsin–Madison as an assistant scientist, where she oversaw the mass spectrometry programme. She became an associate professor in 2015, and full professor in 2019.

Ge develops high-resolution mass spectrometry proteomics to better understand cardiac disease. To image the very large proteins of human heart tissue, Ge combines fourier-transform ion cyclotron resonance (FT–ICR) mass spectrometry with electron-capture dissociation. She has worked to create a top-down disease proteomic platform that allows for the separation, detection and characterisation of the biomarkers of heart damage.

Nanoproteomics, a technique developed by Ge and co-workers, makes use of nanoparticles and high resolution mass spectrometry to capture and characterise cardiac troponins, including troponin I. Being able to test for and characterise troponin I would help with the early detection and diagnosis of heart disease. The peptide-functionalised superparamagnetic nanoparticles are combined with top-down mass spectrometry to identify the molecular fingerprints of troponins. Rather than just detecting cardiac troponins, which is possible using ELISA-based antibody testing, this higher level of characterisation will allow Ge to identify various forms of modified troponins, allowing a personalised understanding of cardiac disease.

Ge served on the board of the Top-Down Proteomics Consortium, on the editorial board of the Journal of Muscle Research and Cell Motility, as treasurer for the American Society for Mass Spectrometry (2016-2018).

Ying Ge publications indexed by Google Scholar.

== Awards and honours ==
- 2016 Georges Guiochon Faculty Fellowship
- 2018 H. I. Romnes Faculty Fellowship
- 2019 Analytical Scientist Power List
- 2020 American Society for Mass Spectrometry Biemann Medal
- 2020 Analytical Scientist Power List
- 2021 Human Proteome Organization (HUPO) Clinical and Translational Proteomics Award
- 2021 Analytical Scientist Power List
- 2024 Analytical Scientist Power List, ranked #8 in "Human Health Heroes" field

== Selected publications ==
- Smith, Lloyd M; Kelleher, Neil L (2013-02-27). "Proteoform: a single term describing protein complexity". Nature Methods. 10 (3): 186–187. doi:10.1038/nmeth.2369. ISSN 1548-7091. PMC 4114032. PMID 23443629.
- Ge, Ying; Lawhorn, Brian G.; ElNaggar, Mariam; Strauss, Erick; Park, Joo-Heon; Begley, Tadhg P.; McLafferty, Fred W. (2002-01-01). "Top Down Characterization of Larger Proteins (45 kDa) by Electron Capture Dissociation Mass Spectrometry". Journal of the American Chemical Society. 124 (4): 672–678. Bibcode:2002JAChS.124..672G. doi:10.1021/ja011335z. ISSN 0002-7863. PMID 11804498.
- Horn, David M.; Ge, Ying; McLafferty, Fred W. (2000-10-01). "Activated Ion Electron Capture Dissociation for Mass Spectral Sequencing of Larger (42 kDa) Proteins". Analytical Chemistry. 72 (20): 4778–4784. doi:10.1021/ac000494i. ISSN 0003-2700. PMID 11055690.
- Sze, Siu Kwan; Ge, Ying; Oh, HanBin; McLafferty, Fred W. (2002-02-19). "Top-down mass spectrometry of a 29-kDa protein for characterization of any posttranslational modification to within one residue". Proceedings of the National Academy of Sciences. 99 (4): 1774–1779. doi:10.1073/pnas.251691898. ISSN 0027-8424. PMC 122269. PMID 11842225.
