= Susan Weintraub =

American scientist

- Education: University of Texas Health Science Center at San Antonio
- Known for: mass spectrometry
- Scientific career
- Fields: Analytical chemistry, mass spectrometry
- Workplaces: University of Texas Health Science Center at San Antonio
- Website: http://gsbs.uthscsa.edu/faculty/susan-t.-weintraub-ph.d

Susan Weintraub is an American scientist. She is a professor at the University of Texas Health Science Center at San Antonio (UTHSCSA). She received a BS in chemistry from the University of Pennsylvania in 1967, MS in chemistry from Trinity University in 1970 and a PhD in biochemistry from UTHSCSA in 1979. She was the president of the American Society for Mass Spectrometry for the period of 2012-2014. In 2017 she was named a Fellow of the American Association for the Advancement of Science (AAAS), and Fellow of the American Society for Mass Spectrometry in 2025. She is an associate editor of the Journal of Proteome Research.

Her research focuses on biomedical mass spectrometry where she used mass spectrometry in the early 1970s for quantitative analysis of brain neurochemicals. She has been director of the mass spectrometry core resource at UTHSCSA since 1979.
