= Veronica M. Bierbaum =

American chemist

Veronica Bierbaum
- Education: University of Pittsburgh
- Scientific career
- Fields: Analytical chemistry Mass spectrometry
- Workplaces: University of Colorado Boulder

Veronica Marie Bierbaum is an emeritus professor of chemistry at the University of Colorado Boulder, specialising in mass spectrometry in the areas of atmospheric chemistry and stellar chemistry.

== Education ==
Bierbaum studied for a BA in chemistry at the Catholic University of America in Washington, D.C., graduating in 1970. She then studied for a PhD at the University of Pittsburgh, graduating in 1974. Bierbaum demonstrated an aptitude for chemistry whilst in secondary school, winning first place in the Senior High chemistry section of the Pennsylvania Junior Academy of Science competition.

== Career ==
Bierbaum joined the University of Colorado, Boulder, in 1974 as a postdoctoral research associate. Her early work at Boulder involved collaborations with Charles H. DePuy and Stephen Leone. Her research interests strongly overlapped with DePuy and Leone, and focus on the use of mass spectrometry to understand gas-phase ion-molecule interactions, an area of research which is relevant to the fields of atmospheric chemistry and stellar chemistry. She remains at University of Colorado, Boulder, and was appointed research professor in the department of chemistry and biochemistry, as well as joining JILA (formerly the Joint Institute for Laboratory Astrophysics) which is based at Boulder.

Bierbaum served as the president of the American Society for Mass Spectrometry between 1996 and 1998, and prior to this served as secretary and vice-president. She was also an associate editor for the Journal of the American Society for Mass Spectrometry, standing down in 2019 after 20 years.

She was awarded the Frank H. Field and Joe L. Franklin Award for Outstanding Achievement in Mass Spectrometry in 2021.

Bierbaum is also active at the University of Colorado, Boulder, in enabling access to higher education for minorities.
