= Kristina Håkansson =

Swedish analytical chemist

- Education: Uppsala University (M.Sc., Ph.D.)
- Known for: Mass Spectrometry; Discovery of negative-ion ECD; Fourier transform ion cyclotron resonance
- Awards: American Society for Mass Spectrometry 2016 Biemann Medal
- Scientific career
- Fields: Chemistry
- Workplaces: National High Magnetic Field Laboratory
- Thesis: “Method and Technique Development in Peptide and Protein Mass Spectrometry” (2000)
- Doctoral advisor: Per Håkansson (not related)
- Other academic advisors: Alan G. Marshall
- Website: nationalmaglab.org

Kristina Håkansson is an analytical chemist known for her contribution in Fourier transform ion cyclotron resonance mass spectrometry for biomolecular identification and structural characterization.

== Education ==
Håkansson received a M.Sc. in Molecular Biotechnology in 1996 and a Ph.D., also in Molecular Biotechnology in 2000, from Uppsala University. Following her graduation, she did post-doctoral research with Alan G. Marshall at the National High Magnetic Field Laboratory of Florida State University.

== Career and research ==
Håkansson began her academic career at University of Michigan in 2003 and became the director National High Magnetic Field Laboratory's Ion Cyclotron Resonance facility at Florida State University in 2024. She served as editor for Rapid Communications in Mass Spectrometry from 2021 to 2023.

Her research focuses on mass spectrometry, primarily identification and characterization of protein posttranslational modifications by complementary fragmentation techniques such as electron-capture dissociation (ECD)/negative ion ECD (niECD) and infrared multiphoton dissociation (IRMPD) at low (femtomole) levels.

== Awards ==
- 2022 Berzelius Gold Medal, Swedish Society for Mass Spectrometry
- 2018 Agilent Thought Leader Award
- 2017 Hach Lecturer, University of Wyoming
- 2016 Biemann Medal, American Society for Mass Spectrometry
- 2006–2011 National Science Foundation CAREER Award
- 2005–2007 Eli Lilly Analytical Chemistry Award
- 2005–2008 Dow Corning Assistant Professorship, University of Michigan
- 2005 American Society for Mass Spectrometry Research Award
- 2004 Elisabeth Caroline Crosby Research Award, University of Michigan
- 2004–2007 Searle Scholar Award
- 2000–2002 Swedish Foundation for International Cooperation in Research and Higher Education (STINT) postdoctoral fellow
