= Bob Hodges (speed skater) =

Canadian speed skater and scientist (1943–2021)

Personal information
- Born: 30 December 1943; Saskatoon, Saskatchewan, Canada
- Died: 16 April 2021 (aged 77); Saskatoon, Saskatchewan, Canada
- Scientific career
- Fields: Biochemistry
- Thesis: Sequence studies on rabbit skeletal tropomysin. (1971)
- Doctoral advisor: Lawrence Bruce Smillie
- Doctoral students: Jennifer Van Eyk

Sport
- Sport: Speed skating

Robert Stanley Hodges FRSC (30 December 1943 – 16 April 2021) was a Canadian speed skater and scientist. He competed at the 1968 Winter Olympics and the 1972 Winter Olympics. He later became a scientist, earning his PhD from the University of Alberta, and worked as a postdoctoral researcher under Robert Bruce Merrifield at Rockefeller University. He became a professor at the University of Alberta and later at the University of Colorado School of Medicine. He died at his home in Saskatoon on 16 April 2021.
