= Sarah Trimpin =

Swiss chemist

- Born: Switzerland
- Education: Universität Konstanz
- Awards: Biemann Medal
- Scientific career
- Fields: Proteomics
- Workplaces: Wayne State University
- Academic advisors: David E. Clemmer

Sarah Trimpin is a German/American chemist and Professor at the Wayne State University. Her research interests revolve around ionizing methods in mass spectrometry. Her work has resulted in the formation of a company (MSTM, LLC) which aims to bring advanced ionization methods to industry. Her work has been recognized by the American Society for Mass Spectrometry with the Research Award in 2010, and the Biemann Medal in 2019.

Trimpin received her undergraduate training at the Universität Konstanz in Germany in 1999 and her PhD from the Max Planck Institute for Polymer Research in 2002 (Mainz). After postdoctoral work at Oregon State University and Indiana University, she joined the faculty at Wayne State University in 2008.
