= Susan D. Richardson =

American chemist

- Education: Georgia College & State University Emory University(PhD)
- Scientific career
- Fields: Chemistry
- Workplaces: University of South Carolina
- Doctoral advisor: Fred Menger

Susan D. Richardson is the Arthur Sease Williams Professor of Chemistry at the University of South Carolina. Richardson's research primarily focuses on emerging environmental contaminants, particularly those affecting drinking water systems and including disinfection by-products (DBPs) that can occur in water purification systems. She is a member of the National Academy of Engineering.

== Education ==
She earned her bachelor's degree in chemistry and mathematics at Georgia College & State University. Additionally, she completed her Ph.D. in chemistry at Emory University, under the direction of Fred Menger. She received an honorary doctorate from Cape Breton University.

== Career and awards ==
Prior to joining the faculty at University of South Carolina, Richardson worked at the National Exposure Research Laboratory of U.S. Environmental Protection Agency for 25 years, first as a postdoctoral fellow and then a research chemist.

Richardson has been the recipient of numerous awards, including (among others): American Chemical Society Award for Creative Advances in Environmental Science and Technology (2008), Fellow of the American Chemical Society (2016); Fellow of the American Association for the Advancement of Sciences (2019); the Herty Medal (2020).

Richardson served on a number of board positions with the American Society for Mass Spectrometry: Treasurer (2002-2004), Vice President for Programs (2018-2020), and President (2020-2022). In 2023, she was named one of the top ten "Connectors and Interdisciplinarians" in the Power List by the Analytical Scientist. In 2024, she was ranked #2 in the "Plant Protectors" field of the Analytical Scientist Power List.
