= Jennifer S. Brodbelt =

American chemist

Jennifer Sue Brodbelt
- Education: Purdue University
- Known for: Mass Spectrometry
- Awards: Field and Franklin Award
- Scientific career
- Fields: Analytical Chemistry, Mass Spectrometry
- Workplaces: Purdue University, University of California, Santa Barbara, University of Texas at Austin
- Thesis: Aspects of ion chemistry in mass spectrometry (1988)
- Doctoral advisor: R. Graham Cooks
- Website: http://brodbelt.cm.utexas.edu/research/

Jennifer S. Brodbelt is an American chemist known for her research using mass spectrometry to characterize organic compounds, especially biopolymers and proteins.

== Education and career ==
Brodbelt has an undergraduate degree from the University of Virginia and earned her Ph.D. from Purdue University where she worked on gas phase ion chemistry using mass spectrometry. Following her Ph.D. she was a postdoc at the University of California, Santa Barbara before joining the University of Texas at Austin in 1989. As of 2016, she is the Roland Pettit Centennial Chair in the Department of Chemistry.

She was the president of the American Society for Mass Spectrometry from 2014 to 2016.

== Research ==
Brodbelt's research centers on the development of mass spectrometry-based methods to characterize organic molecules. Brodbelt's early research established methods to use chemical ionization in ion trap mass spectrometers and applied this method to the analysis of petroleum samples. She subsequently worked on gas-phase ion chemistry and photodissociation as methods to break apart organic compounds before they are analyzed by a mass spectrometer. Her work has led to the analysis of compounds including recreational drugs, sunscreen, and pesticides. Her work also includes investigations into proteins and other organic compounds produced by bacteria, such as lipopolysaccharides. In her research, she aimed to develop creative techniques for stimulating ions to produce enlightening fragmentation patterns.

== Selected publications ==
- Brodbelt, Jennifer S. (24 March 2014). "Photodissociation mass spectrometry: new tools for characterization of biological molecules". Chemical Society Reviews. 43 (8): 2757–2783. doi:10.1039/C3CS60444F. ISSN 1460-4744. PMC 3966968. PMID 24481009.
- Shaw, Jared B.; Li, Wenzong; Holden, Dustin D.; Zhang, Yan; Griep-Raming, Jens; Fellers, Ryan T.; Early, Bryan P.; Thomas, Paul M.; Kelleher, Neil L.; Brodbelt, Jennifer S. (28 August 2013). "Complete Protein Characterization Using Top-Down Mass Spectrometry and Ultraviolet Photodissociation". Journal of the American Chemical Society. 135 (34): 12646–12651. Bibcode:2013JAChS.13512646S. doi:10.1021/ja4029654. PMC 3757099. PMID 23697802.
- Kempen, Esther C.; Brodbelt, Jennifer S. (1 November 2000). "A Method for the Determination of Binding Constants by Electrospray Ionization Mass Spectrometry". Analytical Chemistry. 72 (21): 5411–5416. doi:10.1021/ac000540e. ISSN 0003-2700. PMID 11080894.

== Awards ==
She was awarded the Agnes Fay Morgan Research Award in 1995. In 2019, Brodbelt received the Frank H. Field and Joe L. Franklin Award for Outstanding Achievement in Mass Spectrometry from the American Chemical Society. In 2023, she was named one of the "Mentors and Educators" in the Power List by the Analytical Scientist. In 2024, she was awarded the Thomson Medal by the International Mass Spectrometry Foundation.
