= Ljiljana Paša-Tolić =

Croatian research scientist

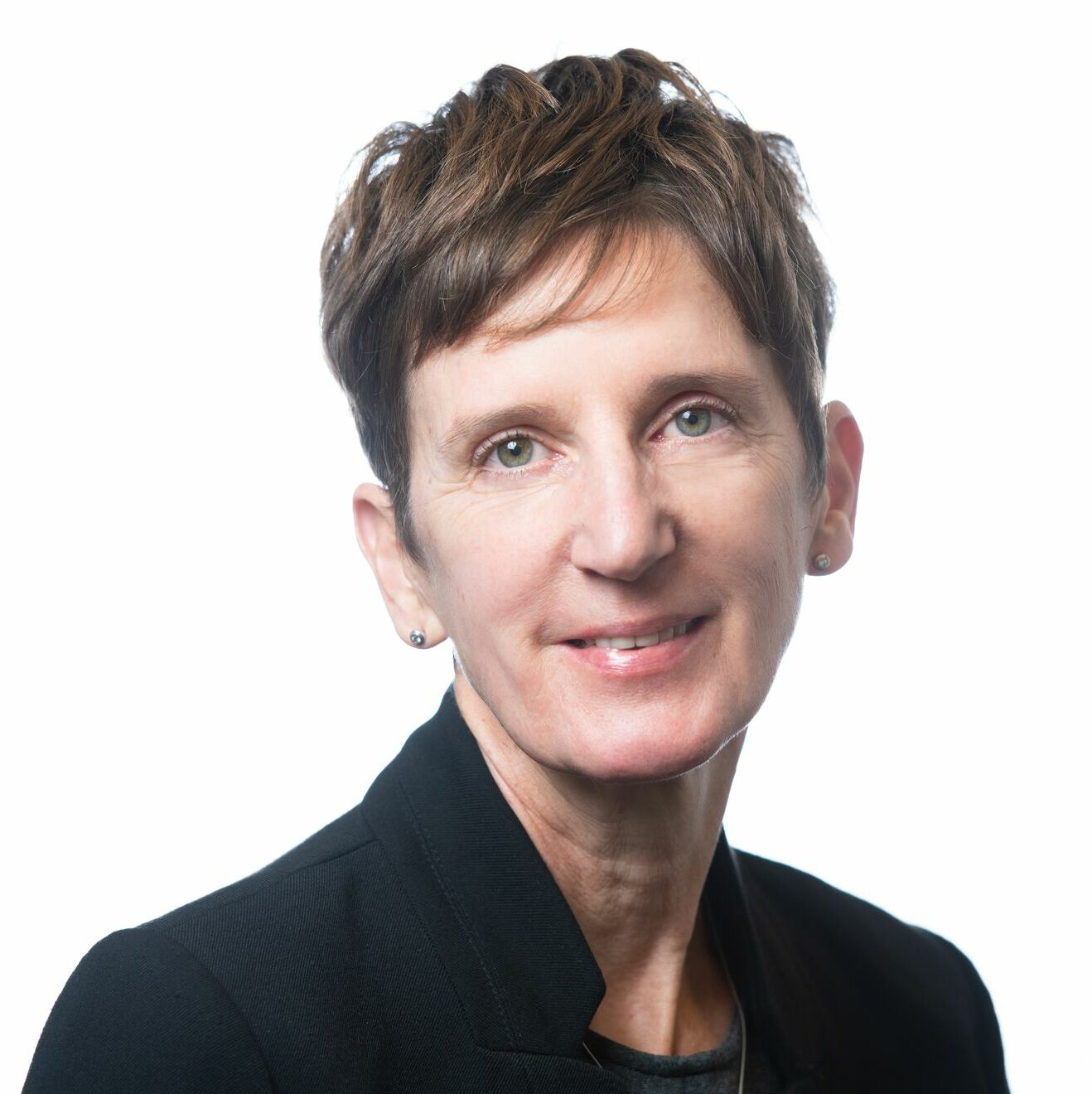
- Education: University of Zagreb
- Scientific career
- Fields: Mass spectrometry Proteomics; Metabolomics
- Workplaces: Pacific Northwest National Laboratory; National High Magnetic Field Laboratory
- Thesis: (1992)
- Website: www.pnnl.gov/science/staff/staff_info.asp?staff_num=5883

Ljiljana Paša-Tolić is a Croatian research scientist who is a research fellow in Functional and Systems Biology at the Pacific Northwest National Laboratory. She is responsible for developing capability in mass spectrometry at the PNNL Environmental Molecular Sciences Laboratory. Her research looks to develop analytical techniques to modify protein abundance.

== Early life and education ==
Paša-Tolić earned a masters' and a Ph.D. in chemistry at the Faculty of Science, University of Zagreb. She remained in Zagreb for graduate research, specializing in physical organic chemistry.

== Research and career ==
She completed post-doctoral research at the National High Magnetic Field Laboratory under the direction of Alan G. Marshall. She developed a fourier-transform ion cyclotron resonance spectrometer to study biopolymers. She then moved to the PNNL as a postdoctoral fellow in Richard D. Smith's laboratory in1995.

Paša-Tolić is an expert in mass spectrometry and the development of analytical methods to understand molecular processes. She developed sophisticated modalities of mass spectrometry to investigate the polymerases found in plants. Her research showed that the polymerases found in Arabidopsis are actually derivatives of a polymerase found in eukaryotes.

== Honors and awards ==
In 2016 she was named a laboratory fellow at the Pacific Northwest National Laboratory, one of the highest levels for scientific and technical staff at the laboratory.

In 2021, Paša-Tolić was elected to the Washington State Academy of Sciences. She was included in the 2021 and 2024 Analytical Scientist Power List. She received the Jochen Franzen Award from the International Mass Spectrometry Foundation in 2024, for "outstanding contributions to innovations in structural, spatial and/or separation analysis with mass spectrometry”.

== Selected publications ==
- Paša-Tolić, Ljiljana; Jensen, Pamela K.; Anderson, Gordon A.; Lipton, Mary S.; Peden, Kim K.; Martinović, Suzana; Tolić, Nikola; Bruce, James E.; Smith, Richard D. (1 September 1999). "High Throughput Proteome-Wide Precision Measurements of Protein Expression Using Mass Spectrometry". Journal of the American Chemical Society. 121 (34): 7949–7950. doi:10.1021/ja991063o. ISSN 0002-7863.
- Lipton, Mary S.; Paša-Tolić, Ljiljana; Anderson, Gordon A.; Anderson, David J.; Auberry, Deanna L.; Battista, John R.; Daly, Michael J.; Fredrickson, Jim; Hixson, Kim K.; Kostandarithes, Heather; Masselon, Christophe; Markillie, Lye Meng; Moore, Ronald J.; Romine, Margaret F.; Shen, Yufeng; Stritmatter, Eric; Tolić, Nikola; Udseth, Harold R.; Venkateswaran, Amudhan; Wong, Kwong-Kwok; Zhao, Rui; Smith, Richard D. (20 August 2002). "Global analysis of the Deinococcus radiodurans proteome by using accurate mass tags". Proceedings of the National Academy of Sciences. 99 (17): 11049–11054. doi:10.1073/pnas.172170199. ISSN 0027-8424. PMC 129300. PMID 12177431.
- Paša-Tolić, Ljiljana; Masselon, Christophe; Barry, Richard C.; Shen, Yufeng; Smith, Richard D. (2004). "Proteomic Analyses using an Accurate Mass and time Tag Strategy". BioTechniques. 37 (4): 621–639. doi:10.2144/04374RV01. ISSN 0736-6205.
- The Consortium for Top Down Proteomics; Smith, Lloyd M; Kelleher, Neil L (2013). "Proteoform: a single term describing protein complexity". Nature Methods. 10 (3): 186–187. doi:10.1038/nmeth.2369. ISSN 1548-7091. PMC 4114032. PMID 23443629.
