= Vicki Wysocki =

American scientist

- Education: Purdue University
- Known for: mass spectrometry
- Awards: Field and Franklin Award (2017)
- Scientific career
- Fields: Analytical chemistry, mass spectrometry
- Workplaces: Ohio State University; Georgia Tech
- Thesis: Internal Energy Effects in Mass Spectrometry (1987)
- Doctoral advisor: R. Graham Cooks

Vicki Hopper Wysocki is an American scientist. She is a professor and the current chair of the School of Chemistry and Biochemistry at Georgia Tech

== Education ==
Vicki Wysocki received a BS in chemistry from Western Kentucky University in 1982. She received a PhD in chemistry at Purdue University in 1987, under the supervision of R. Graham Cooks. She did post-doctoral work at Purdue University and at the US Naval Research Laboratory as a National Research Council Fellow.

== Career ==
Wysocki became an assistant professor at Virginia Commonwealth University in 1990, and an associate professor in 1994. In 1996, she continued her career at University of Arizona, and she was promoted to professor in 2000. She was the chair of the department of chemistry and biochemistry at University of Arizona. She is a professor and an Ohio Eminent Scholar at Ohio State University, and the director of the Campus Chemical Instrument Center.

She was the treasurer (1998–2000), vice president for programs (2014–2016), president (2016–2018) and past president (2018–2020) of the American Society for Mass Spectrometry. She served on the editorial board of Analyst, and she served as an associate editor of Analytical Chemistry. She serves as the editor-in-chief of the Journal of the American Society for Mass Spectrometry, she serves on the Honorary Board of International Journal of Mass Spectrometry.

== Awards ==
- 2023 The Analytical Scientist The Power List - Leaders and Advocates
- 2022 International Mass Spectrometry Foundation Thomson Medal Award
- 2022 American Chemical Society Division of Analytical Chemistry Award in Chemical Instrumentation
- 2021 The Analytical Scientist The Power List
- 2019 The Analytical Scientist The Power List
- 2019 German Mass Spectrometry Society (Deutsche Gesellschaft für Massenspektrometrie, DGMS) Wolfgang Paul Lecture
- 2017 American Chemical Society Frank H. Field and Joe L. Franklin Award for Outstanding Achievement in Mass Spectrometry
- 2013 Purdue University Department of Chemistry Outstanding Alumni Award
- 2009 American Society for Mass Spectrometry John B. Fenn Award for a Distinguished Contribution in Mass Spectrometry
- 1992 American Society for Mass Spectrometry Research Award
