= Tsippy Tamiri =

Israeli mass spectrometrist

- ציפי טמירי
- Born: 1952; Rishon LeZion, Israel
- Died: 2017 (aged 64–65)
- Education: Hebrew University of Jerusalem; Technion – Israel Institute of Technology
- Awards: Yehuda Yinon Award (2011)
- Scientific career
- Workplaces: Israel Police
- Thesis: Specific hydrogen transitions in difunctional systems under conditions of electron and chemical ionization
- Doctoral advisor: Asher Mandelbaum, Shmuel Zitrin

Tsippy Tamiri (Hebrew: ציפי טמירי; 1952 – 2017) was an Israeli mass spectrometrist, specialized in the analysis of explosives, drugs, and poisons.

== Early life and education ==
Tsippy Tamiri grew up in Rishon LeZion. She enlisted in the Israel Defense Forces at eighteen. After discharge, she obtained a bachelor's degree in pharmacy from the Hebrew University of Jerusalem. She received a master's degree in chemistry from the Hebrew University of Jerusalem and a PhD in chemistry from Technion – Israel Institute of Technology.

== Career ==
Tamiri worked at the forensic laboratory of the Israel Police, where she was the head of the mass spectrometry department. She conducted research in the analysis of explosives, drugs and poisons. She published on the preparation, characterization, and analysis of urea nitrate.

Tamiri served as the president of the Israeli Society of Mass Spectrometry. She served on the organizing committee of the second Middle Eastern and Mediterranean Sea Region Countries Mass Spectrometry – MASSA 2013 Workshop in 2013.

== Selected publications ==
Book chapter

- Analysis of Explosives by Mass Spectrometry, Tsippy Tamiri and Shmuel Zitrin, in Forensic Investigation of Explosions, A. Beveridge (Ed), 2011.
- GC/MS Analysis of PETN and NG in Post-Explosion Residues, T. Tamiri, S. Zitrin, S. Abramovich-Bar, Y. Bamberger and J. Sterling, in Advances in Analysis and Detection of Explosives, J. Yinon (Ed), 1993.

== Awards ==
Tamiri received the Yehuda Yinon Award in 2011.
