= Julie A. Leary =

American chemist

- Education: Massachusetts Institute of Technology(PhD)
- Known for: Mass Spectrometry
- Scientific career
- Fields: Chemist
- Workplaces: University of California Davis
- Doctoral advisor: Klaus Biemann

Julie A. Leary is a emeritus professor in the department of molecular and cellular biology at University of California, Davis and the department of chemistry.

== Early life and education ==
Leary obtained a PhD in Chemistry Massachusetts Institute of Technology in 1985, under the direction of Klaus Biemann.

== Career and research interests ==
- Proteomics
- Glycomics
- https://www.researchgate.net/scientific-contributions/Julie-A-Leary-38178727

Leary served as a Member-at-Large for Education for the American Society for Mass Spectrometry (2001-2002).

== Awards ==
- 2000 Biemann Medal
- 2010 Fellow of the American Association for the Advancement of Science (AAAS)
