= Lidia Gall =

Russian mass spectrometrist (1934–2023)

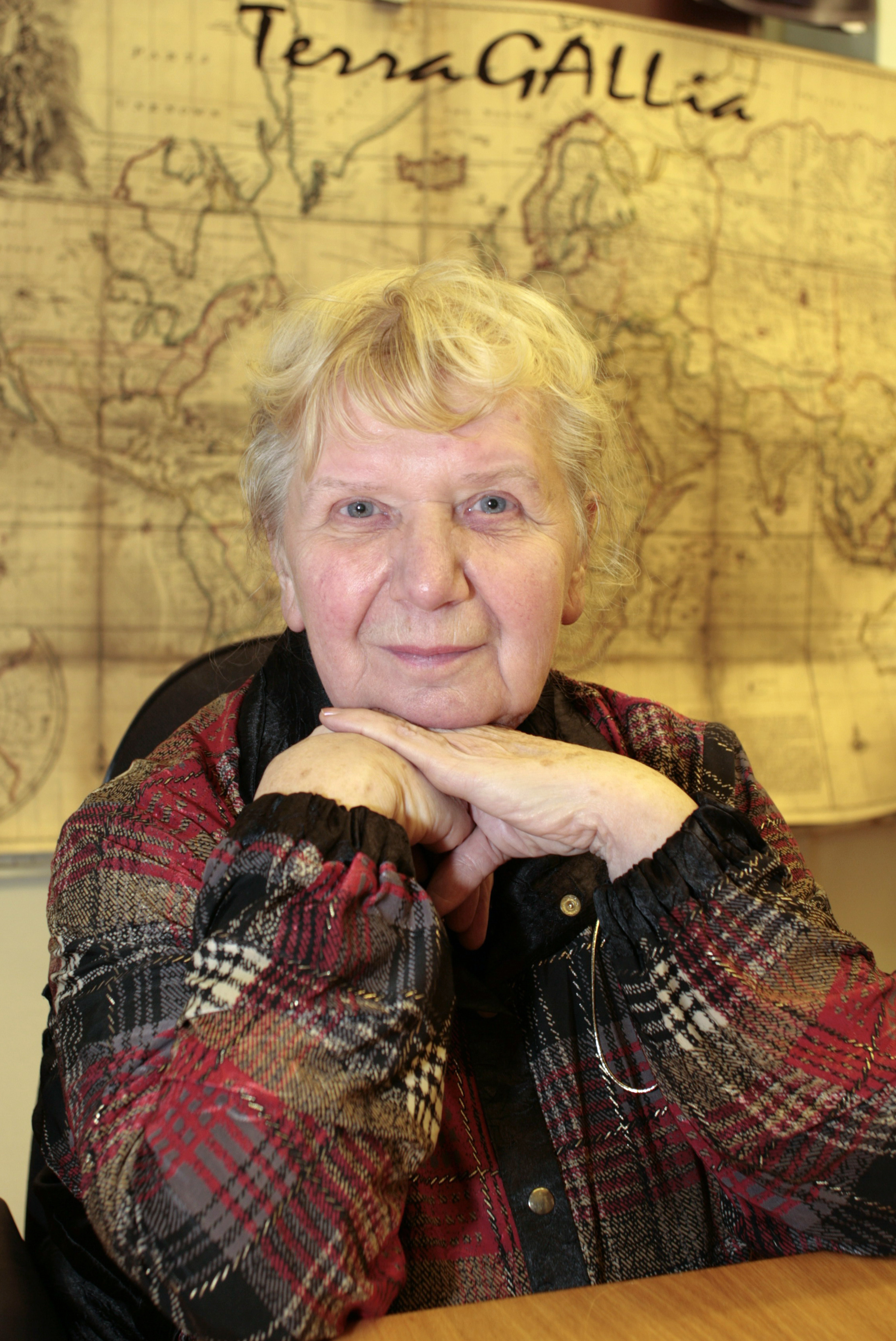
- Gall in 2023
- Born: Lidia Nikolaevna Loginova; 1 September 1934; Leningrad, Russian SFSR, USSR
- Died: 21 October 2023 (aged 89); Saint Petersburg, Russia
- Education: Leningrad Polytechnic Institute
- Known for: Electrospray ionization
- Spouse: R. N. Gall
- Awards: Thomson Medal (2022); Manuel Riveros Medal (2022)
- Scientific career
- Fields: Mass spectrometry
- Workplaces: Russian Academy of Sciences
- Thesis: Physical principles defining the ion-optical properties of ion sources for mass spectrometers

Lidia Nikolaevna Gall (Russian: Лидия Николаевна Галль; née Loginova (Логинова); 1 September 1934 – 21 October 2023) was a Russian mass spectrometrist, credited as one of the inventors for electrospray ionization source and high-performance mass analyzers.

== Life and career ==
Gall studied physical electronics at Leningrad Polytechnic Institute and graduated in 1957. After graduation, she conducted research at the Leningrad Special Design Department. She received her PhD in 1973 from Leningrad Polytechnic Institute.

Gall developed ERIAD, an ionization method of liquid samples at atmospheric pressure for mass spectrometry, which is an analogue of electrospray ionization. She researched on a number of high-performance mass analyzers: static mass spectrometers, orbital trapping (Gall, L. N.; Golikov, Y. K.; Aleksandrov, M. L.; Pechalina, Y. E.; Holin, N. A. USSR Inventor's Certificate 1247973, 1986), MTI-350 series of mass spectrometers; and worked on theoretical calculations of ion trajectories.

Gall was a professor at the Institute of Analytical Instrumentation of the Russian Academy of Sciences.

Lidia Gall died on 21 October 2023, at the age of 89.

== Awards ==
For her contribution to mass spectrometry, Gall was awarded the Thomson Medal by the International Mass Spectrometry Foundation in 2022. In the same year, she was awarded the Manuel Riveros Medal by the Brazilian Society of Mass Spectrometry.
