= Journal of Mass Spectrometry =

- Discipline: Mass spectrometry
- Language: English
- Edited by: David Muddiman

Publication details
- Former name: Organic Mass Spectrometry
- History: 1968-present
- Publisher: John Wiley & Sons
- Frequency: Monthly
- Impact factor: 2.1 (2025)

Standard abbreviations
- ISO 4: J. Mass Spectrom.

Indexing
- CODEN: JMSPFJ
- ISSN: 1076-5174 (print); 1096-9888 (web)
- LCCN: sn94005017
- OCLC no.: 30505598

Links
- Journal homepage

The Journal of Mass Spectrometry is a peer-reviewed scientific journal covering all aspects of mass spectrometry including instrument design and development, ionization processes, mechanisms and energetics of gaseous ion reactions, spectroscopy of gaseous ions, theoretical aspects, ion structure, analysis of compounds of biological interest, methodology development, applications to elemental analysis and inorganic chemistry, computer-related applications and developments, and environmental chemistry and other fields that use innovative aspects of mass spectrometry. It was established in 1968 as Organic Mass Spectrometry by Heyden & Son and obtained its current title in 1995. It is currently published by John Wiley & Sons.

According to the Journal Citation Reports, the journal has a 2020 impact factor of 1.982.

== See also ==
- Mass Spectrometry Reviews
- Rapid Communications in Mass Spectrometry
