= Mass Spectrometry Reviews =

- Discipline: Chemistry
- Language: English

Publication details
- History: 1982 to present
- Publisher: John Wiley & Sons (UK)
- Impact factor: 9.373 (2016)

Standard abbreviations
- ISO 4: Mass Spectrom. Rev.

Indexing
- ISSN: 0277-7037

Links
- Journal homepage

Mass Spectrometry Reviews (usually abbreviated as Mass Spectrom. Rev.), is a peer-reviewed scientific journal, published since 1982 by John Wiley & Sons. It publishes reviews in selected topics of mass spectrometry and associated scientific disciplines bimonthly.

== See also ==
- Journal of Mass Spectrometry
- Rapid Communications in Mass Spectrometry
- John Wiley & Sons
