= Catherine Clarke Fenselau =

American scientist (born 1939)

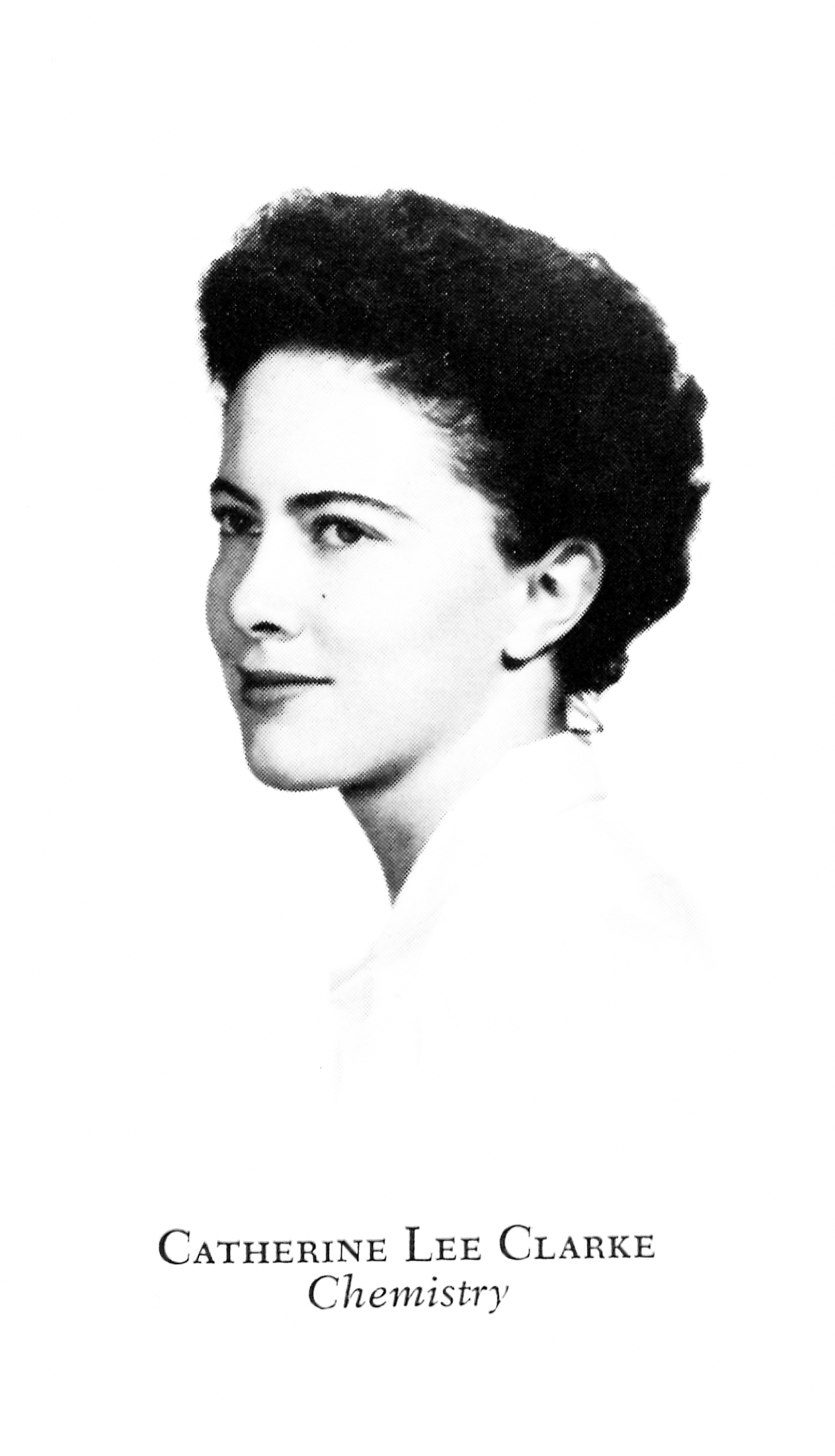
- Born: April 15, 1939 (age 87); York, Nebraska, U.S.
- Other name: Catherine Lee Clarke
- Education: Bryn Mawr College (AB); Stanford University (PhD)
- Spouse(s): Allan H. Fenselau (divorced); Robert J. Cotter
- Awards: Garvan–Olin Medal (1985); Maryland Chemist of the Year; NIH Merit Award.
- Scientific career
- Fields: Biochemistry
- Workplaces: Johns Hopkins School of Medicine, University of Maryland, College Park

Catherine Clarke Fenselau (born 15 April 1939) is an American scientist who was the first trained mass spectrometrist on the faculty of an American medical school; she joined Johns Hopkins School of Medicine in 1968. She specializes in biomedical applications of mass spectrometry. She has been recognized as an outstanding scientist in the field of bioanalytical chemistry because of her work using mass spectrometry to study biomolecules.

== Early life and education ==
Catherine Lee Clarke was born on 15 April 1939, in York, Nebraska. She graduated from Bryn Mawr College in 1961 with an Artium baccalaureus in chemistry.

She received a Ph.D. in organic chemistry in 1965 from Stanford University, working with Carl Djerassi. As a field, organic mass spectrometry was new and had great potential impact for the pharmaceutical industry. The mass spectrometer was a new tool for examining the structures of small botanical molecules. Djerassi's lab examined electron ionization of molecules, studying basic mechanisms such as fragmentation and hydrogen transfer. For her thesis research, Catherine made a series of deuterium labeled analogues of amines, alcohols, esters and amides.

== Career ==
She spent the next two years in postdoctoral positions, studying on a 1965–1966 fellowship from the American Association of University Women at the University of California, Berkeley with Melvin Calvin. In 1967, she worked at the Space Sciences Laboratory with Melvin Calvin and A. L. Burlingame. Calvin's lab was developing methods to be used in the analysis of lunar rock samples. Fenselau described an analysis technique for preparing lipid samples from Moon rocks, before actual lunar samples were available for testing.

=== Johns Hopkins School of Medicine ===
Fenselau was the first trained mass spectroscopist to join a medical faculty when she joined the mass spectrometry laboratory in the Pharmacology Department at Johns Hopkins University in 1968. When she arrived, Johns Hopkins did not have a mass spectrometer. Fenselau did her initial research by driving to the National Institutes of Health (NIH) laboratories to use their instruments. Paul Talalay, chairman of Pharmacology, and Albert L. Lehninger, the chairman of Biological Chemistry, submitted proposals for funding for a state of the art mass spectrometer. They were successful in obtaining funding from the National Science Foundation for a CEC 21-110 double-focusing mass spectrometer for Fenselau to use.

She has done considerable work in the area of cancer and anti-cancer treatments, studying drugs such as cyclophosphamide. With oncologist O. M. Colvin, she identified the active metabolite of cyclophosphamide, and published the first quantification of the drug and its metabolites in urine and blood from patients. She led the development of synthetic and analytical methods for glucuronides, and studied the reactions of acyl-linked glucuronides with Martin Stogniew, work that has been important in understanding drug-derived liver disease.

=== University of Maryland ===
Although Fenselau and her second husband Robert Cotter both worked in mass spectrometry at Johns Hopkins, they chose to develop independent careers rather than a joint lab. "We felt that we could make twice as many contributions to science if we had two separate labs and evolved in our own ways that reflected our own skills and our own institutions."

In 1987, Catherine Fenselau moved to the University of Maryland, Baltimore County (UMBC) to become chairperson of the Department of Chemistry and Biochemistry. She chose the university in part because she wanted greater opportunities for teaching. At UMBC she was one of the first faculty members involved in the Meyerhoff Scholarship Program, an initiative of UMBC president Freeman Hrabowski to attract minority undergraduate researchers.

There, funding from the National Institutes of Health, the National Science Foundation, and others enabled Fenselau to establish a state-of-the-art mass spectrometry lab, the Structural Biochemistry Center (SBC). Equipment included a JEOL HX110/110 four-sector tandem mass spectrometer, a Hewlett-Packard quadrupole mass spectrometer with particle beam and Vestec electrospray ion sources, and 500 and 600 MHz NMR spectrometers. Research areas studied in the lab included biopolymer structure, ion thermochemistry, proton-binding entropies, glucuronide and glutathione conjugation, and possible mechanisms for acquired drug resistance.

In June 1987, Fenselau oversaw the installation of a HighResMALDI Fourier transform mass spectrometer in her lab. The Fourier transform mass spectrometer used a strong magnetic field to trap and excite ions and measure the resulting electrical signals. Appointed Chairperson of the Department of Chemistry at University of Maryland, College Park in 1998, Fenselau supervised the disassembly, transport, and reassembly of the complex instrument, moving it safely to her new lab. With it, she has studied the chemistry of gaseous ions, chemical reactions of drugs with proteins, and posttranslational modification in protein biosynthesis.

In 2005, she acted as the interim Dean for the College of Graduate Studies and Associate Vice President for Research in the Department of Chemistry and Biochemistry, and was named Distinguished University Professor at the University of Maryland in 2017. She has been president of the American Society for Mass Spectrometry (ASMS) from 1982 to 1984, founding president of US-Human Proteome Organization (US HUPO), and senior vice president of international Human Proteome Organization. She serves as a member of the Western Region of the Awards Committee of the Human Proteome Organization.

She was the founding editor of Biomedical Mass Spectrometry (now the Journal of Mass Spectrometry) and associate editor of Analytical Chemistry. She has published more than 350 peer-reviewed articles. A 2020 issue of the Journal of Mass Spectrometry is dedicated to Fenselau for her distinguished career.

Catherine Fenselau continues to teach at the University of Maryland College Park. More than 150 post-doctoral fellows, graduate students and undergraduate students have received training in her laboratories at Johns Hopkins University, University of Maryland, Baltimore County, and the University of Maryland, College Park.

== Awards ==
Fenselau has received a number of significant awards, including the following.

- Garvan Medal, 1985 as a distinguished woman in chemistry.
- Maryland Chemist of the Year, American Chemical Society, 1989.
- Eastern Analytical Symposium Award for Outstanding Achievements in the Fields of Analytical Chemistry, 1999
- National Institutes of Health MERIT Award, 1991–2001.
- Distinguished Service Award, Human Proteome Organization, 2006
- Field & Franklin Award for Contributions in Mass spectrometry, American Chemical Society (ACS), 2008.
- Thomson Medal, International Mass Spectrometry Foundation, 2009.
- Ralph N. Adams Award in Bioanalytical Chemistry, 2010
- John B. Fenn Award for a Distinguished Contribution in Mass Spectrometry, American Society for Mass Spectrometry, 2012.
- Eastern Analytical Symposium Award for Outstanding Achievements in Mass Spectrometry, 2014
- Distinguished Contribution Award, the Association for Mass Spectrometry and Advances in Clinical Lab (MSACL), 2017
- US Human Proteome Organization Catherine E. Costello Lifetime Achievement in Proteomics Award, 2022.
- Fellow of the American Society for Mass Spectrometry, 2025.

== Personal life ==
Fenselau was married twice, first to Allan H. Fenselau, with whom she had two sons, and later to Robert J. Cotter.
