= Clinical Proteomics =

- Discipline: Biochemistry
- Language: English
- Edited by: Daniel W. Chan

Publication details
- History: 2004-present
- Publisher: BioMed Central
- Impact factor: 3.988 (2020)

Standard abbreviations
- ISO 4: Clin. Proteom.

Indexing
- CODEN: CPLRCX
- ISSN: 1542-6416 (print); 1559-0275 (web)
- LCCN: 2002213884
- OCLC no.: 51088619

Links
- Journal homepage

Clinical Proteomics is a peer-reviewed open access medical journal published by BioMed Central. Covers scientific research in the field of translational proteomics with an emphasis on the application of proteomic technology to all aspects of clinical research. It was established in March 2004 and the editor in chief is Daniel W. Chan (Johns Hopkins School of Medicine).

== Scope ==
The journal publishes articles on a variety of subjects including: Clinical sample collection and handling to preserve proteins, new technology, including protein arrays, mass spectrometry, microanalytic devices, nanotechnology, and biosensors for protein-based clinical bioassays and clinical chemistry assays, bioinformatics tools including pattern recognition, artificial intelligence, and computer learning algorithms.

== Abstracting and indexing ==
The journal is abstracted and indexed in EBSCO databases, AGRICOLA, Chemical Abstracts Service, and EMBASE.
