= Journal of Proteome Research =

- Discipline: Proteomics
- Language: English
- Edited by: John R. Yates

Publication details
- History: 2002–present
- Publisher: American Chemical Society (United States)
- Frequency: Monthly
- Impact factor: 4.4 (2022)

Standard abbreviations
- ISO 4: J. Proteome Res.

Indexing
- CODEN: JPROBS
- ISSN: 1535-3893 (print); 1535-3907 (web)
- LCCN: 2001211122
- OCLC no.: 47082747

Links
- Journal homepage

The Journal of Proteome Research is a peer-reviewed scientific journal published since 2002 by the American Chemical Society. Its publication frequency switched from bimonthly to monthly in 2006. The current editor-in-chief is John R. Yates.

== Abstracting and indexing ==
The journal is abstracted and indexed in:

- Chemical Abstracts Service
- Scopus
- Science Citation Index Expanded

According to the Journal Citation Reports, the journal has a 2022 impact factor of 4.4.
