= Proteomics (journal) =

- Discipline: Biology
- Language: English
- Edited by: Lucie Kalvodova

Publication details
- History: 2001–present
- Publisher: Wiley VCH (Germany)
- Frequency: bimonthly
- Open access: Hybrid
- Impact factor: 3.984 (2020)

Standard abbreviations
- ISO 4: Proteomics

Indexing
- CODEN: PROTC7
- ISSN: 1615-9853 (print); 1615-9861 (web)

Links
- Journal homepage; Online archive

Proteomics is a peer-reviewed scientific journal covering topics including whole proteome analysis of organisms, protein expression profiling, disease, pharmaceutical, agricultural and biotechnological applications, and analysis of cellular systems, organelles and protein complexes. It is published by Wiley VCH and the current editor-in-chief is Lucie Kalvodova.

According to the Journal Citation Reports, the journal has a 2020 impact factor of 3.984, ranking it 23rd out of 78 journals in the category "Biochemical Research Methods".
