= Journal of the American Society for Mass Spectrometry =

- Discipline: Mass spectrometry
- Language: English
- Edited by: Joseph A. Loo

Publication details
- History: 1990–present
- Publisher: ACS Publications (United States)
- Frequency: Monthly
- Impact factor: 3.109 (2020)

Standard abbreviations
- ISO 4: J. Am. Soc. Mass Spectrom.

Indexing
- ISSN: 1044-0305

Links
- Journal homepage

The Journal of the American Society for Mass Spectrometry is a monthly peer-reviewed scientific journal published by ACS Publications since 2020. From 2011 to 2019 it was published by Springer Science+Business Media and prior to that by Elsevier. It is the official publication of the American Society for Mass Spectrometry and freely available to members. The journal covers all aspects of mass spectrometry.

Until 2015, Michael L. Gross (Washington University in St. Louis) was the founding editor-in-chief; he was succeeded by Joseph A. Loo (University of California, Los Angeles).

The journal is abstracted and indexed in MEDLINE.
