= American Society for Mass Spectrometry =

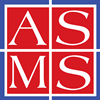
- Formation: 1969
- Headquarters: Santa Fe, New Mexico
- Location: United States
- Members: ~10,000
- Official language: English
- President: Joseph A. Loo
- Website: http://www.asms.org/

The American Society for Mass Spectrometry (ASMS) is a professional association based in the United States that supports the scientific field of mass spectrometry. As of 2018, the society had approximately 10,000 members primarily from the US, but also from around the world. The society holds a large annual meeting, typically in late May or early June as well as other topical conferences and workshops. The society publishes the Journal of the American Society for Mass Spectrometry.

== Awards ==
The Society recognizes achievements and promotes academic research through four annual awards. The Biemann Medal and the John B. Fenn Award for a Distinguished Contribution in Mass Spectrometry both are awarded in recognition of singular achievements or contributions in fundamental or applied mass spectrometry, with the Biemann Medal being focused on individuals who are early in their careers. The Ronald A. Hites Award is awarded for outstanding original research demonstrated in papers published in the Journal of the American Society for Mass Spectrometry. The Research Awards are given to young scientists in mass spectrometry, based on the evaluation of their proposed research. The Fellows of ASMS are awarded to individuals in recognition for their scientific contribution to mass spectrometry and for their contribution to the ASMS community.

== Publications ==
- Journal of the American Society for Mass Spectrometry
- Measuring Mass: From Positive Rays to Proteins

== Past presidents ==
The past presidents of ASMS are:

- William S. Young 1953–1954
- M. John O'Neal 1954–1956
- William Priestley Jr. 1956–1958
- R. August Friedel 1958–1960
- Vernon H. Dibeler 1960–1962
- Russell E. Fox 1962–1964
- Norman D. Coggeshall 1964–1966
- Henry M. Rosenstock 1966–1968
- Joe L. Franklin 1968–1970
- Richard E. Honig 1970–1972
- Frank H. Field 1972–1974
- Harry J. Svec 1974–1976
- Jean H. Futrell 1976–1978
- James A. McCloskey 1978–1980
- Burnaby Munson 1980–1982
- Catherine Fenselau 1982–1984
- R. Graham Cooks 1984–1986
- Gerry G. Meisels 1986–1988
- Ronald A. Hites 1988–1990
- Robert C. Murphy 1990–1992
- Henry M. Fales 1992–1994
- Christie G. Enke 1994–1996
- Veronica M. Bierbaum 1996–1998
- Robert J. Cotter 1998–2000
- Richard M. Caprioli 2000–2002
- Catherine E. Costello 2002–2004
- Alan G. Marshall 2004–2006
- Barbara S. Larsen 2006–2008
- Gary Glish 2008–2010
- Scott A. McLuckey 2010–2012
- Susan Weintraub 2012–2014
- Jennifer S. Brodbelt 2014–2016
- Vicki Wysocki 2016–2018
- Richard Yost 2018–2020
- Susan D. Richardson 2020–2022
- Julia Laskin 2022–2024

== Conferences ==
The Society holds an annual conference in late May or early June as well as topical conferences (at Asilomar State Beach in California and Sanibel Island, Florida) and a fall workshop, which is also focused on a single topic. Conferences on Mass Spectrometry and Allied Topics have been held yearly since 1953.

== See also ==
- International Mass Spectrometry Foundation
- List of female mass spectrometrists
