= Human Proteome Organization =

International consortium

The Human Proteome Organization (HUPO) is an international consortium of national proteomics research associations, government researchers, academic institutions, and industry partners. The organization was launched in February 2001, and it promotes the development and awareness of proteomics research, advocates on behalf of proteomics researchers throughout the world, and facilitates scientific collaborations between members and initiatives. Ultimately, it is organized to gain a better and more complete understanding of the human proteome.

== Congress ==
Since 2002, HUPO organizes one international congress each year, with past congresses held in Cancun in 2022, virtually in 2021 and 2020, Adelaide in 2019, Orlando in 2018, in Dublin in 2017, in Taipei in 2016 and in Vancouver 2015, chaired by Christoph H. Borchers.

== Awards ==
HUPO awards multiple awards each year, among them the

- Distinguished Service Award
- Translational Proteomics Award
- Science & Technology Award
- Discovery in Proteomic Sciences Award
- Distinguished Achievement Award in Proteomic Sciences

== See also ==
- Human Genome Organisation
- Human Genome Project
- Proteomics Standards Initiative
- Human Proteome Project
