= Harry Haslam =

Harry Haslam may refer to:

- Harry Haslam (footballer, born 1921) (1921–1986), English footballer and manager
- Harry Haslam (footballer, born 1875) (1875–1943), English footballer
- Harry Haslam (field hockey) (1883–1955), English Olympic field hockey player
- Harry O. Haslam (1874–1945), member of the Legislative Assembly of Alberta

== See also ==
- Harry Hallam (disambiguation)
