= Southwest and Central Wales Local Section (Royal Society of Chemistry) =

South Wales West Local Section
- Adran Leol Gorllewin De Cymru
- The RSC's logo, updated in 2019
- Formation: November 1918; 108 years ago
- Legal status: Charity
- Headquarters: Swansea, Wales
- Chair: Prof Simon Bott
- Secretary: Henry Apsey
- Treasurer: Gordon Hughes
- Parent organization: Royal Society of Chemistry
- Affiliations: Swansea University Chemistry Society
- Website: www.rsc.org/membership-and-community/connect-with-others/geographically/local-sections/south-wales-west

The South Wales West Local Section is one of 35 local sections of the Royal Society of Chemistry in the UK and Ireland. It covers an area including the Local Authority areas of Bridgend, Carmarthenshire, Neath Port Talbot, Pembrokeshire and Swansea.

== History ==
The section was originally established in November 1918 as the South Wales Section of the Royal Institute of Chemistry following the decision to establish local sections to allow members to play a more prominent role in the Institute and develop communication between members in their own areas. Members from the Munitions Factory Pembrey were the nucleus of the section. Despite its name, the South Wales Section served the majority of members in Wales but by 1935 the number of members in the southeast had increased sufficiently for them to form their own South East Wales Local Section and in 1948 the South Wales Section successfully campaigned for a North Wales Local Section to be created. With the amalgamation of the RIC and the Chemical Society in 1971, it became the South Wales West Local Section.

== Governance ==
=== Chair ===
Historically the chair comes alternately from the world of education and from the industry. Up to 1968, seven chairs came from Swansea University, seven from the Mond Nickel Company, three each from the Munitions Factory, local technical colleges and the Llandarcy oil refinery.

- 1918: John Christie, Munitions Factory Pembrey
- F.J. Bloomer, Mond Nickel Company Clydach
- 1924-26: Prof J. E. Coates, University College Swansea
- 1928: Mr. C. M. W. Grieb
- 1931-33: Prof J. E. Coates, University College Swansea
- 1939-41: John Christie, Munitions Factory Pembrey
- 1962: Mr Hermas Evans
- 1968: Dr B.K. Davison
- 2023: Prof Simon Bott, Swansea University

=== Hon Secretary ===
- 1950,1955,1958,1959: Ernest Edward Ayling
- 1959-1962: Harry Hallam
- 1963: Dr W. Williams ARIC
- Jim Ballantine

== Lectures ==
The local section holds a variety of lectures for members and the public. One of the largest meetings was in 1936 when 220 people attended a lecture given by Mr Davidson Pratt on Protecting the civil population from chemical gases. A selected list of lectures is given below.

- 1922: The Low Temperature Carbonisation of Coal, by Mr. T. Eynon Davies AIC
- 1923: Public Analyst
- 1927: Hormones
- 1928: River Pollution by Prof Campbell James
- 1938: Cancer and Chemical Substances, by Professor J. W. Cook FRS
- 1950: The Formation and Reactions of Free Radicals in Solution, by Professor M. G. Evans FRS
- 1955: Chemistry in Rocket Propulsion, by Dr T. P. Hughes
- 1957 and 1965: Blood alcohol testing
- 1957: Chromatography -Theory and Applications, by Dr Tudor S. G. Jones (Wellcome Research Laboratories)
- 1958: Safety in the Chemical Industry, by I. E. Baggs
- 1963: Silicones, Their Chemistry and Applications, by Mr C. J. Baker and Mr Johnson (Midland Silicones)

In former years a successful development was the Annual Lecture on the History of Chemistry associated with the name of Sir William Grove, the scientist from Swansea. One such lecture was by the Nobel Prize winner Archer Martin on his work on the invention of partition chromatography. At one time a Ladies Night were regularly organized lectures such as by Mr H. Armitage of British Nylon Spinners on Nylon in Industry and Fashion.

=== Science and energy lectures ===
For many years Mr Bill Williams and Dr Jim Ballantine conducted a series of demonstration lectures where the children carry out all the experiments themselves to show how energy is interconvertible.

== Prizes and awards ==
=== Hallam Prize ===
Since 1983, each year the section awards a lectureship as part of the Hallam Memorial Fund in memory of the late Harry Evans Hallam.

=== Ayling Prize ===
Since 1963, each year a prize has been awarded by Swansea University in memory of the late Ernest Edward Ayling, who had served the section as Hon Secretary for 21 years.

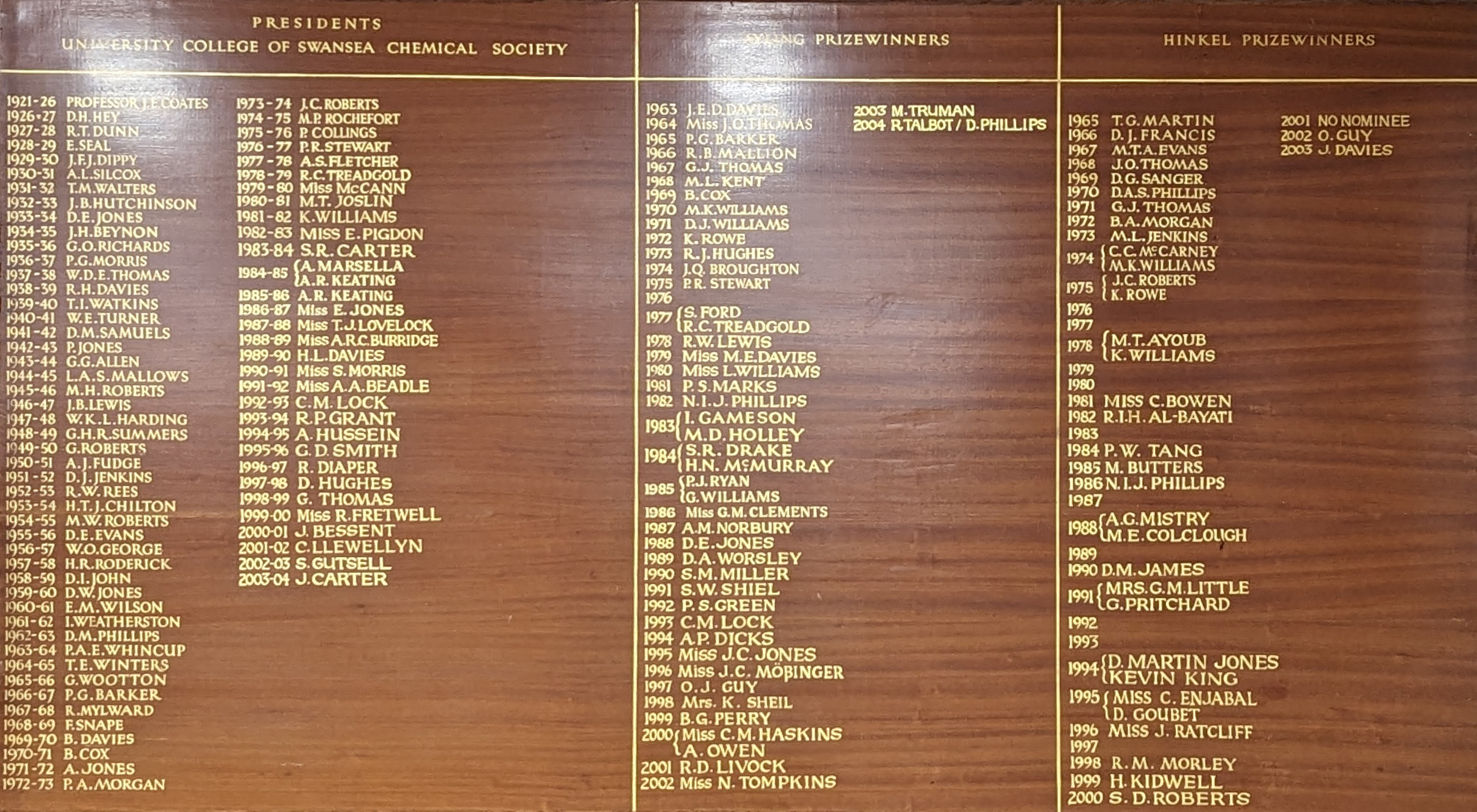
Roll of Honor Purnell Lecture Theater Swansea University

== Notable members ==
- Ernest Edward Ayling
- Jim Ballantine (1934 - 2013), Hon Secretary and Treasurer for 23 years
- John Cadogan
- Harry Hallam
- Keith Smith
- Howard Purnell
