= Plumbylene =

Divalent organolead(II) analogues of carbenes

Plumbylenes, R_{2}Pb

Plumbylenes (or plumbylidenes) are divalent organolead(II) analogues of carbenes, with the general chemical formula, R_{2}Pb, where R denotes a substituent. Plumbylenes possess 6 electrons in their valence shell, and are considered open shell species.

The first plumbylene reported was the dialkylplumbylene, [(Me_{3}Si)_{2}CH]_{2}Pb, which was synthesized by Michael F. Lappert et al in 1973.

Plumbylenes may be further classified into carbon-substituted plumbylenes, plumbylenes stabilized by a group 15 or 16 element, and monohalogenated plumbylenes (RPbX).

== Synthesis ==
Plumbylenes can generally be synthesized via the transmetallation of PbX_{2} (where X denotes halogen) with an organolithium (RLi) or Grignard reagent (RMgX). The first reported plumbylene, [((CH_{3})_{3}Si)_{2}CH]_{2}Pb, was synthesized by Michael F. Lappert et al by transmetallation of PbCl_{2} with [((CH_{3})_{3}Si)_{2}CH]Li. The addition of equimolar RLi to PbX_{2} produces the monohalogenated plumbylene (RPbX); addition of 2 equivalents leads to disubstituted plumbylene (R_{2}Pb). Adding an organolithium or Grignard reagent with a different organic substituent (i.e. R’Li/R’MgX) from RPbX leads to the synthesis of heteroleptic plumbylenes (RR’Pb). Dialkyl-, diaryl-, diamido-, dithioplumbylenes, and monohalogenated plumbyelenes have been successfully synthesized this way.

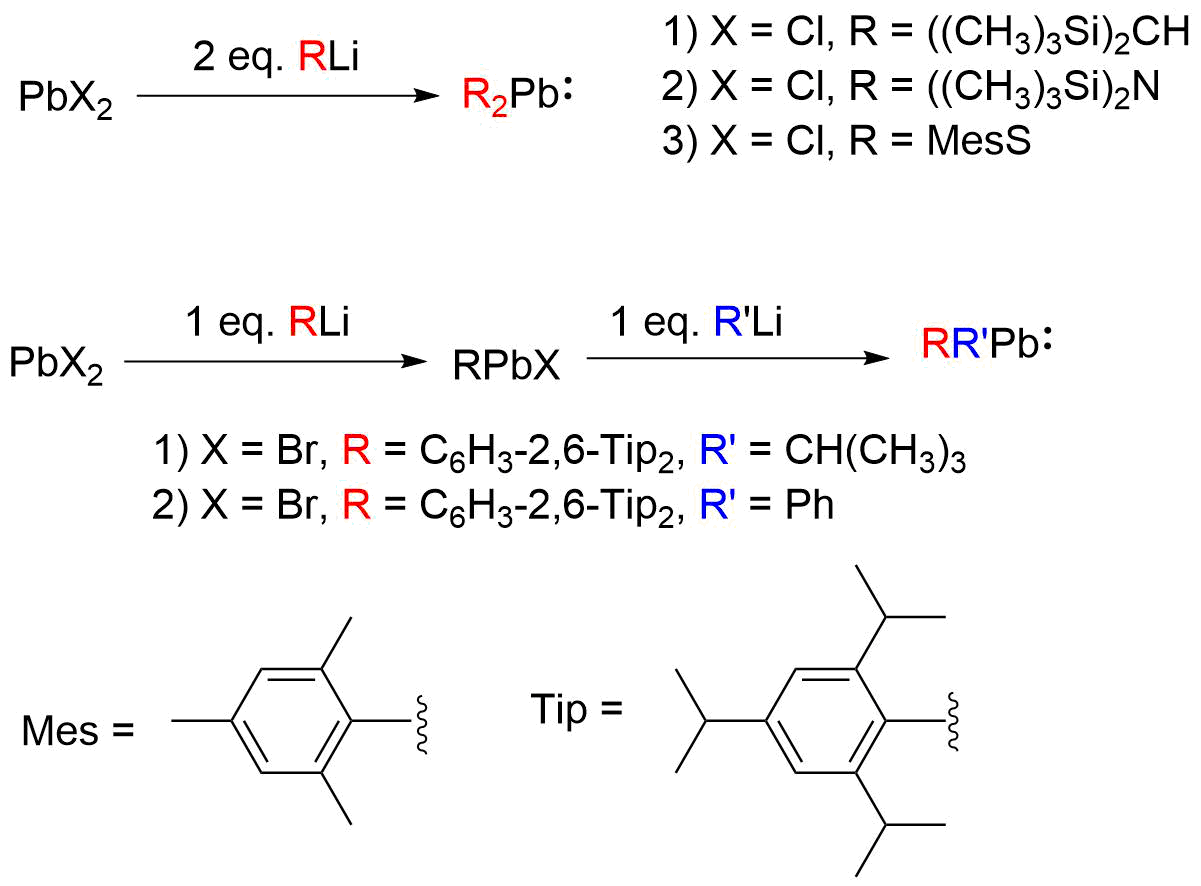
General synthesis of plumbylenes via transmetallation

Transmetallation with [((CH_{3})_{3}Si)_{2}N]_{2}Pb as the Pb(II) precursor has also been used to synthesize diarylplumbylenes, disilylplumbylenes, and saturated N-heterocyclic plumbylenes.

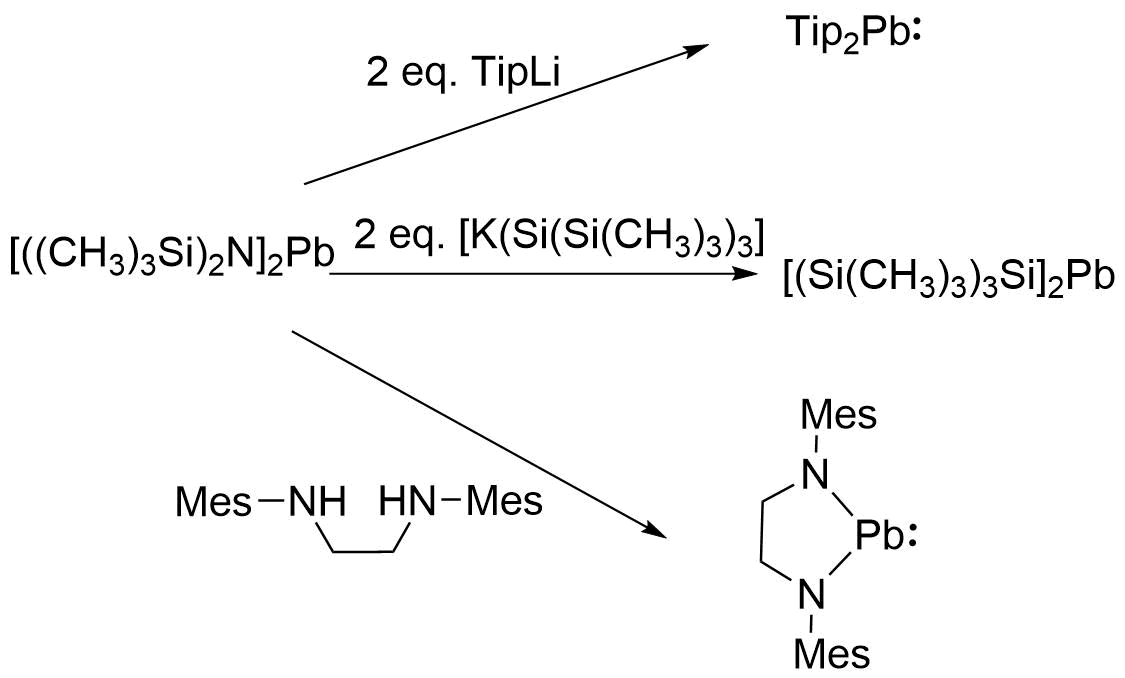
Synthesis of various plumbylenes via transmetallation from [((CH_{3})_{3}Si)_{2}N]_{2}Pb

Alternatively, plumbylenes may be synthesized from the reductive dehalogenation of tetravalent organolead compounds (R_{2}PbX_{2}).

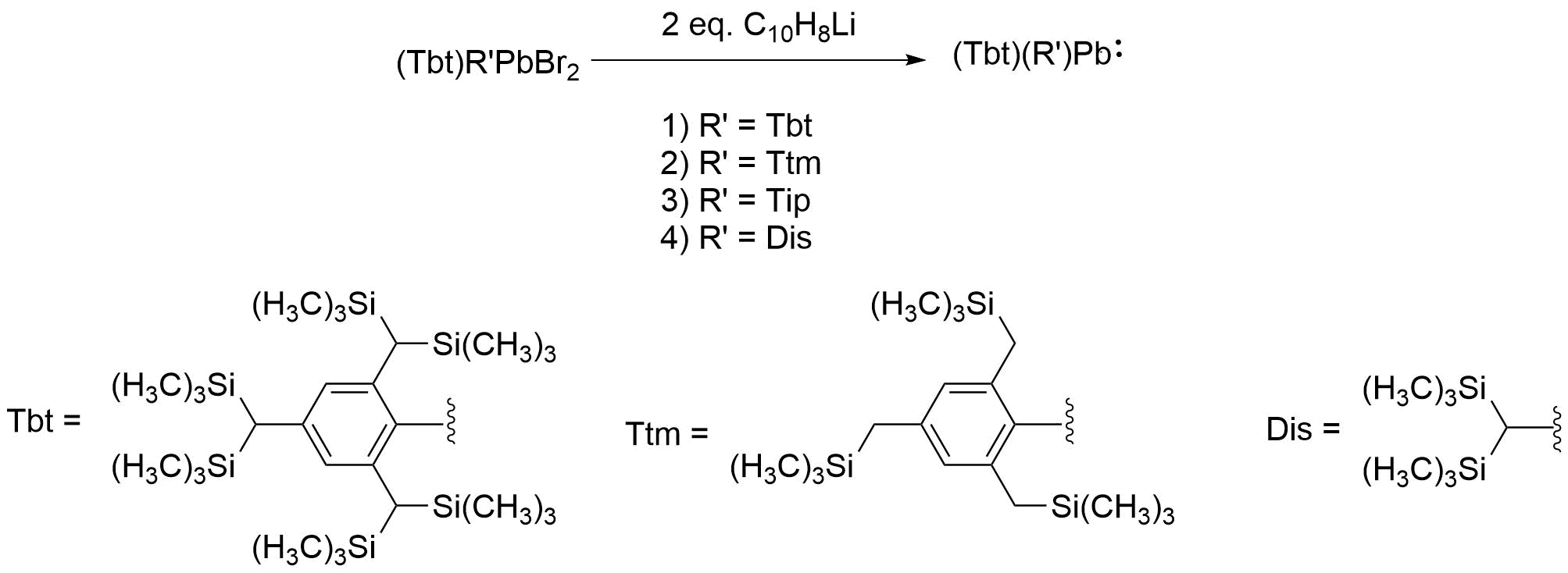
Synthesis of plumbylenes via reductive dehalogenation of tetravalent organolead compounds

== Structure and bonding ==
Key valence orbitals of Pb in plumbylenes: the 6s lone pair and vacant 6p

The bonding and reactivity in plumbylenes are dictated by the inert pair effect, whereby the combination of a widening s–p orbital energy gap as a trend down the group 14 elements and a strong relativistic contraction of the 6s orbital limits sp hybridization. The 6s orbital is deep in energy and inert. Consequently, plumbylenes exclusively have a singlet spin state. They tend to exist in an equilibrium between monomeric and dimeric forms in solution. In contrast carbenes sometimes have a triplet ground state and in all cases readily dimerize.

In dimethyllead, (CH_{3})_{2}Pb, the Pb–C bond length is 2.267 Å and the C–Pb–C bond angle is 93.02°; the singlet–triplet gap is 36.99 kcal mol^{−1}.

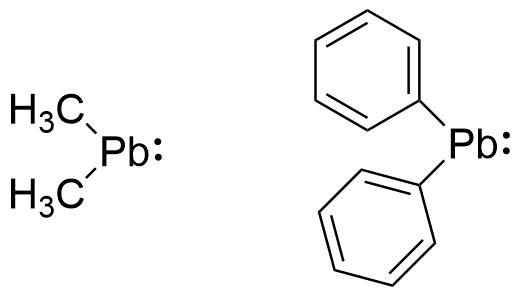
Dimethyllead, (CH_{3})_{2}Pb, and diphenyllead, (C_{6}H_{5})_{2}Pb

The Pb–C bond distance was found to be 2.303 Å and the C–Pb–C angle 105.7°. Notwithstanding the different levels of theory, the larger bond angle for (C_{6}H_{5})_{2}Pb compared to (CH_{3})_{2}Pb can be rationalized by steric effects.

Plumbylenes occur as reactive intermediates in the formation of tetravalent plumbanes (R_{4}Pb). Although the inert pair effect suggests the divalent state should be thermodynamically more stable than the tetravalent state, in the absence of stabilizing substituents, plumbylenes are sensitive to heat and light, and tend to undergo polymerization and disproportionation, forming elemental lead in the process.

Plumbylenes can be stabilized as monomers by the use of sterically bulky ligands (kinetic stabilization) or heteroatom-containing substituents that can donate electron density into the vacant 6p orbital (thermodynamic stabilization).

=== Dimerization ===
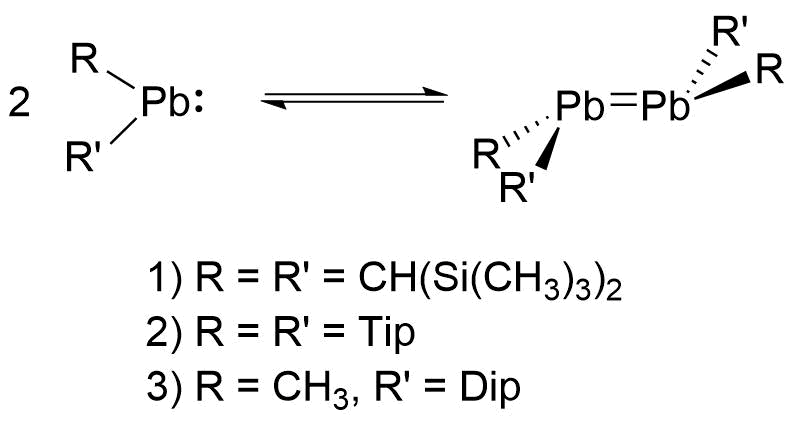
Equilibrium between plumbylenes (monomer) and diplumbenes (dimer) in solution

Organoplumbylenes tend to exist in an equilibrium between the monomeric and dimeric form in solution, and, due to the low dimerization energy, as either monomers or dimers in the solid state, depending on the steric bulk of substituents. Bulky substituents allow the plumbylene to exist exclusively as monomers. In the dimerization, a Lewis acidic vacant 6p orbital interacts with a weakly Lewis basic 6s lone pair.

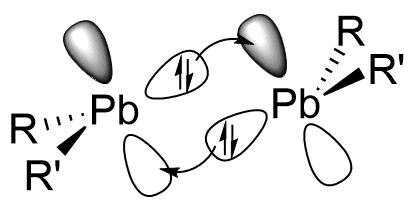
Valence bonding diagram showing donation of 6s lone pairs of Pb into vacant 6p orbital of adjacent Pb in diplumbene

These diplumbenes possess a trans-bent structure similar to that in lighter, non-carbon congeners (disilenes, digermylenes, distannylenes). The observed Pb–Pb bond lengths in diplumbenes (2.90 – 3.53 Å) have been found to typically be longer than those in tetravalent diplumbanes R_{3}PbPbR_{3} (2.84 – 2.97 Å). This, together with the low computed dimerization energy (energy released from the formation of dimers from monomers) of 24 kJ mol^{−1} for Pb_{2}H_{4}, indicates weak multiple bonding. This counterintuitive result is due to the pair of 6s-6p donor-acceptor interactions representing the Pb=Pb double bond in diplumbenes being less energetically favourable compared to the overlap of sp^{n} orbitals (with a higher degree of hybridization than in diplumbenes) in the Pb–Pb single bond in diplumbanes.

Monohalogenated plumbylenes dimerize by formation of bridging halide. The halogen donate a lone pair into the vacant 6p orbital of a second lead atom. Again, sufficiently bulky substituents on lead can sterically block this dimerization mode.

Due to decreasing dimerization energy down Group 14, while monohalogenated stannylenes and plumbylenes dimerize via the halogen-bridging mode, monohalogenated silylenes and germylenes tend to dimerize via the abovementioned multiply-bonded mode instead.

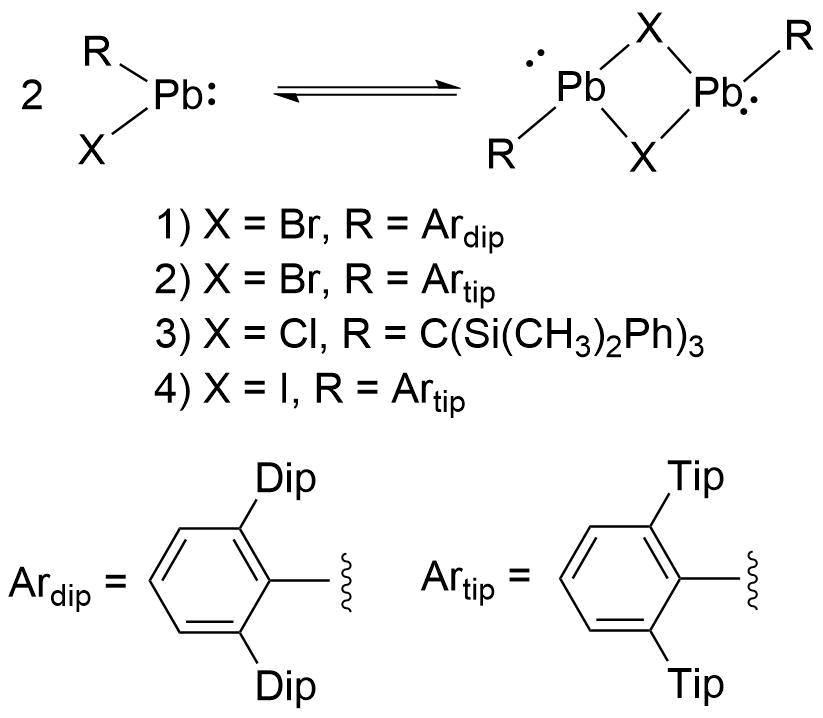
Equilibrium between monomers and halogen-bridged dimers in monohalogenated plumbylenes

N-heterocyclic plumbylene also dimerize leading to C–H activation, existing in solution in an equilibrium between the monomer and a dimer resulting from cleavage of an aryl C–H bond and formation of Pb–C and N–H bonds.

=== Stabilizing intramolecular interactions with substituents bearing lone pairs ===
Plumbylenes may be stabilized by electron donation into the vacant orbital of the lead atom. The two common intramolecular modes are resonance from a lone pair on the atom directly attached to the lead or by coordination from a Lewis base elsewhere in the molecule.

For example, Group 15 or 16 elements directly adjacent to Pb donate a lone pair in manner similar to their stabilizing effect on Fisher carbenes. Common examples of more remote electron-donors include nitrogen atoms that can lead to a six-memberd ring by bonding to the lead. Even a fluorine atom on a remote trifluoromethyl group has been seen forming a coordination to lead in [2,4,6-(CF_{3})_{3}C_{6}H_{2}]_{2}Pb.

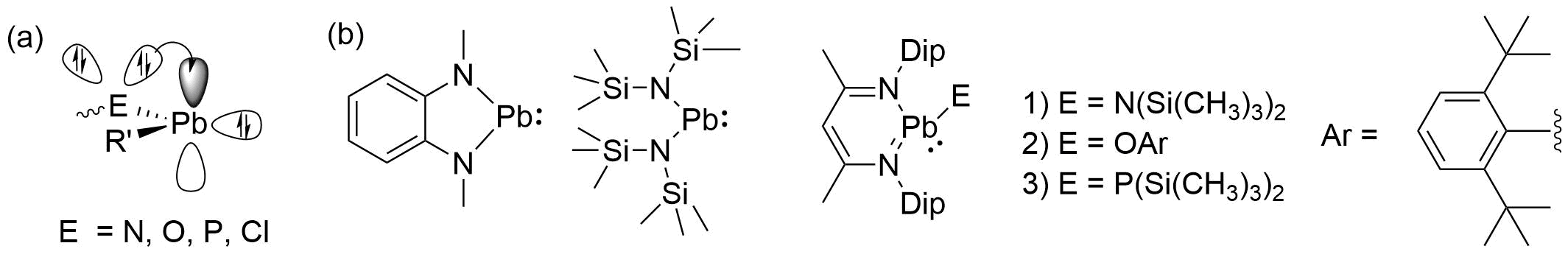
(a) Valence orbital diagram showing the donation of a lone pair on heteroatom E to the vacant 6p orbital of adjacent Pb. (b) Examples of heteroatom-stabilized plumbylenes

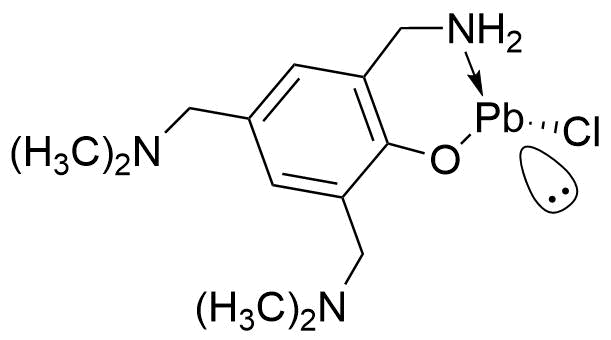
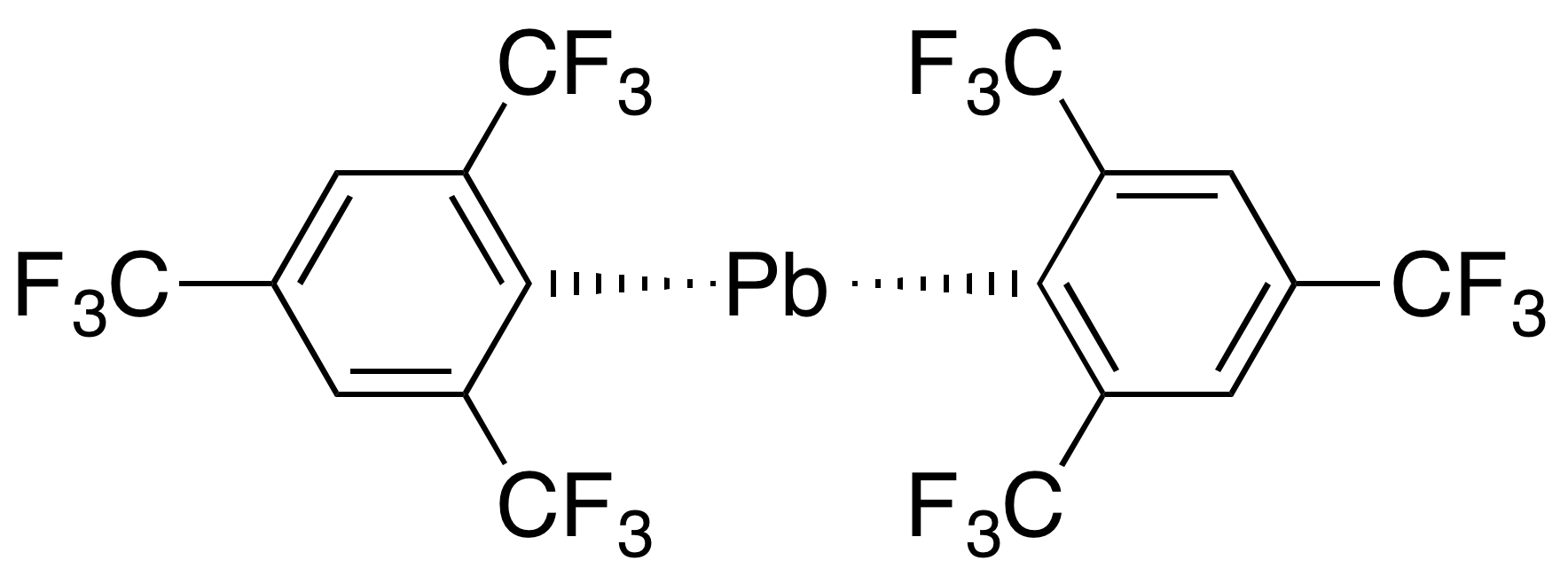
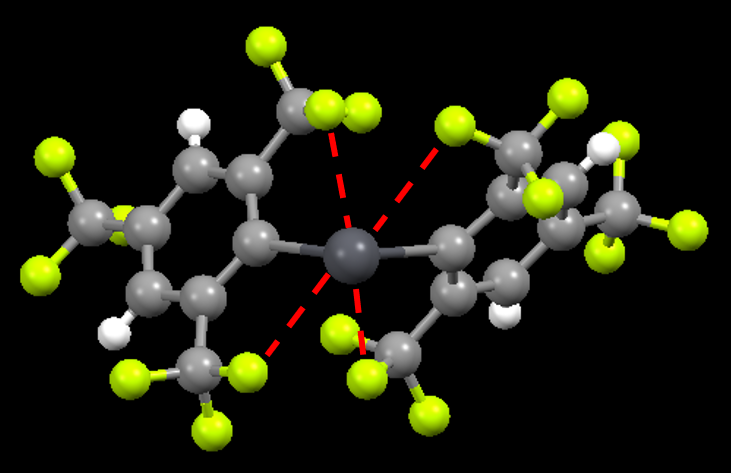
(From left) Example of plumbylene stabilized by lone pair donation from heteratom in side-arm of substituent; [2,4,6-(CF_{3})_{3}C_{6}H_{2}]_{2}Pb and its X-ray structure showing donation of lone pairs on F atoms in substituents to Pb atom (highlighted with red dashed lines)

=== Agostic interactions ===
Agostic interactions have also been shown to stabilize plumbylenes. DFT computations on the compounds [(R(CH_{3})_{2}Si){(CH_{3})_{2}P(BH_{3})}CH]_{2}Pb (R = Me or Ph) found that agostic interactions between bonding B–H orbitals and the vacant 6p orbital lowered the energy of the molecule by ca. 38 kcal mol^{−1}; this was supported by X-ray crystal structures showing the favourable positioning of said B–H bonds in proximity of Pb.

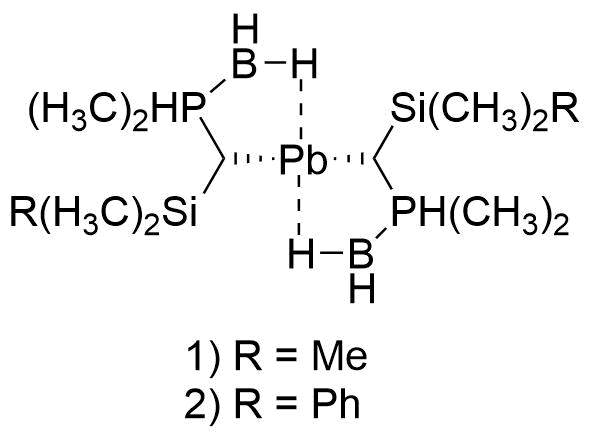
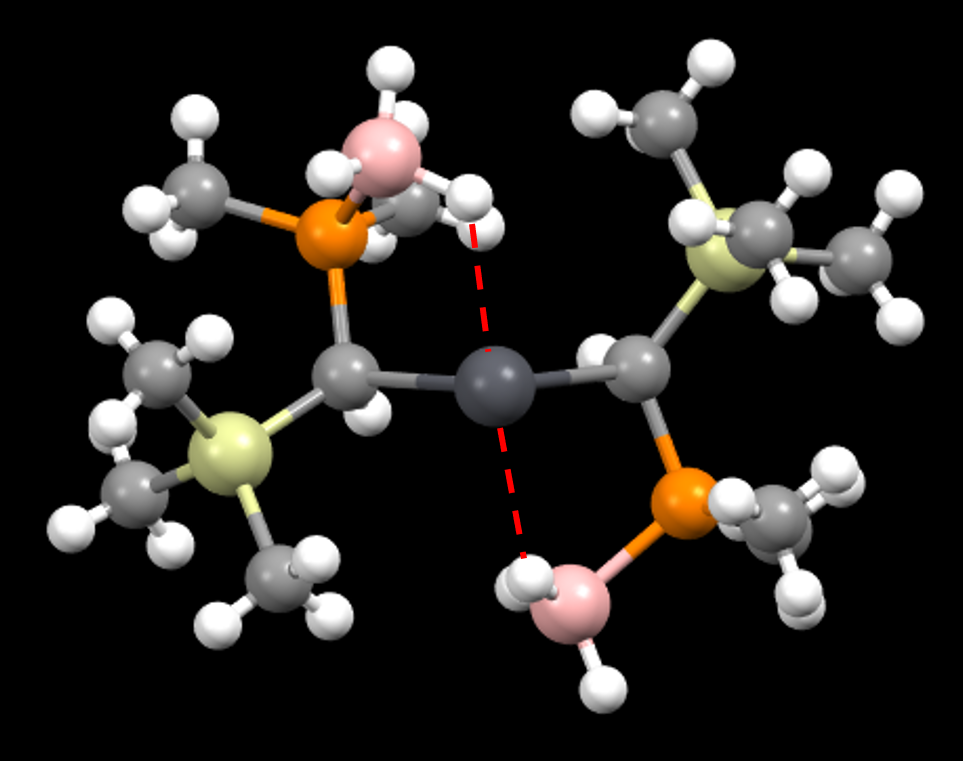
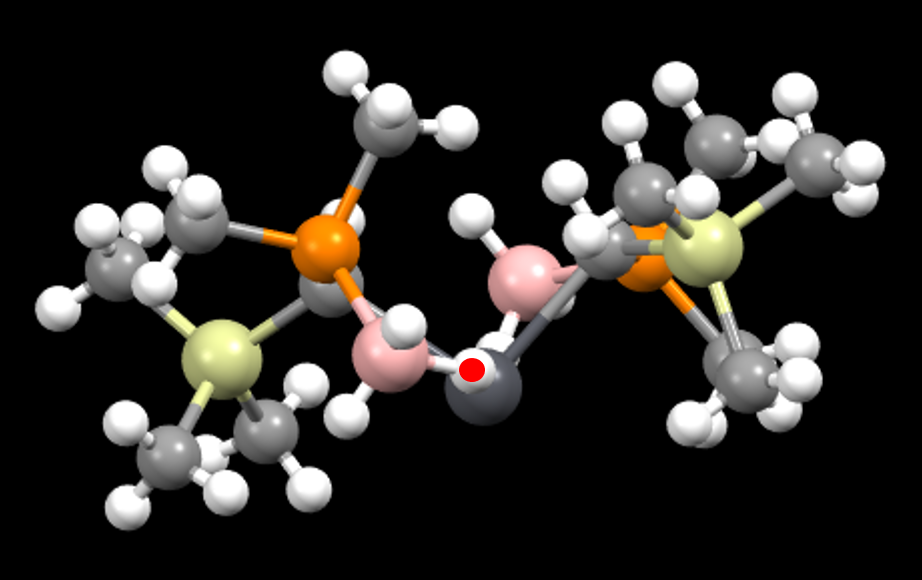
(From left) Examples of plumbylenes exhibiting agostic bonding between B–H bonds and vacant 6p orbital of Pb; front and top views of X-ray crystal structure of [((CH_{3})_{3}Si){(CH_{3})_{3}P(BH_{3})}CH]_{2}Pb. Agostic interactions are highlighted with red dashed lines in the front view; the axis of interactions is indicated with a red dot in the top view.

== Reactivity ==
As previously mentioned, unstabilized plumbylenes are prone to polymerization and disproportionation, and plumbylenes without bulky substituents tend to dimerize in one of two modes. Below, the reactions of stabilized plumbylenes (at least at the temperatures at which they were studied) are listed.

=== Lewis acid-base adduct formation ===
Plumbylenes are Lewis acidic via the vacant 6p orbital and tend to form adducts with Lewis bases, such as trimethylamine N-oxide (Me_{3}NO), 1-azidoadamantane (AdN_{3}), and mesityl azide (MesN_{3}). In contrast, the reaction between stannylenes and Me_{3}NO produces the corresponding distannoxane (from oxidation of Sn(II) to Sn(IV)) instead of the Lewis adduct, which can be attributed to tin being a period above Pb, experiencing the inert pair effect to a lesser degree and hence having a higher susceptibility to oxidation.

In reactions with azides, the precise nature of adducts depends on the moieties near the lead(II) center. A nearby phosphorus atom also acts as a Lewis base, and in the known instance forms a bridging ring; absent such an atom, the azide evolves N_{2} to form a nitrene, which then inserts into a C-H bond of an arene substituent and coordinates to Pb as an amine base.

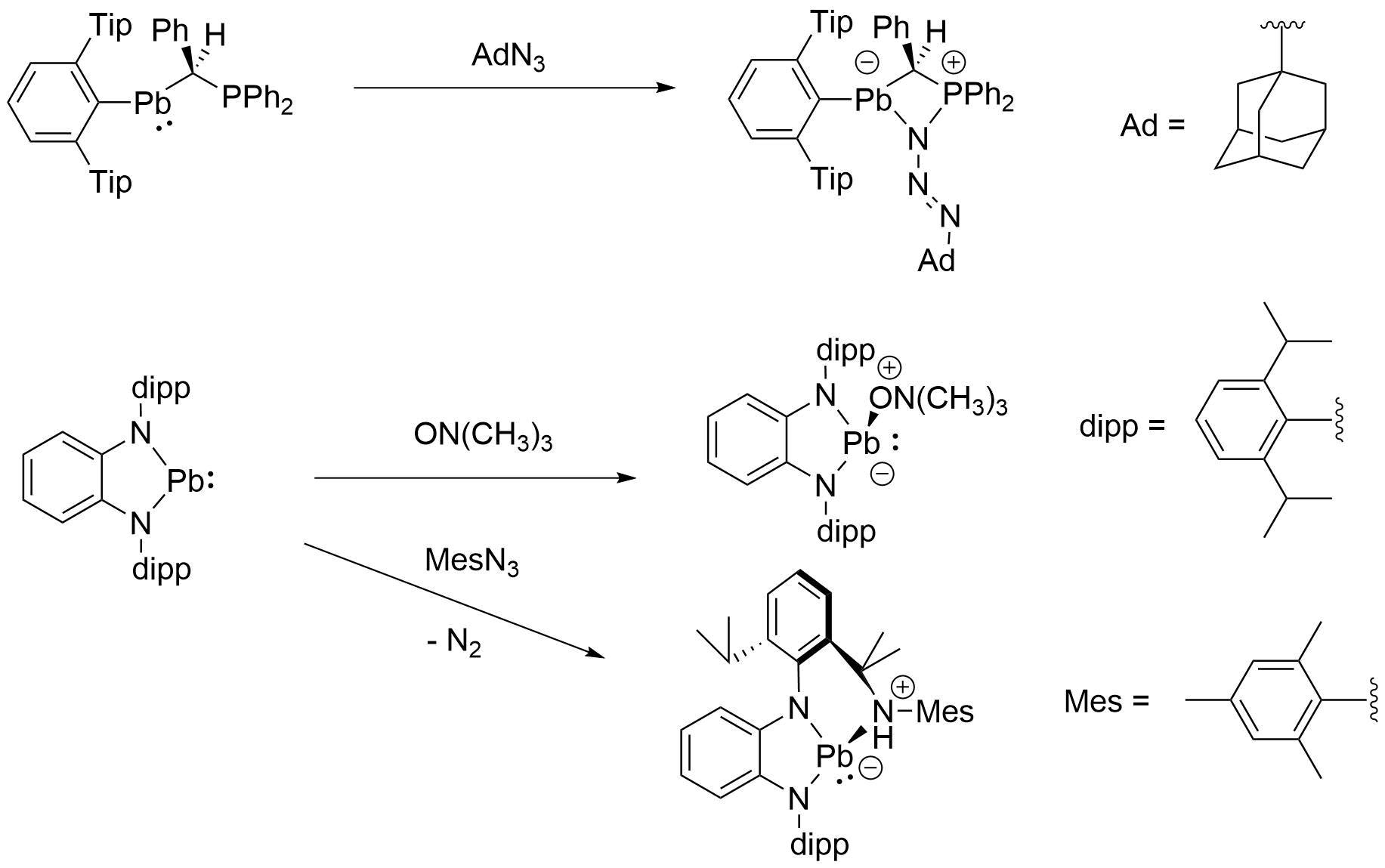
Reaction of plumbylenes with various Lewis bases

=== Insertion ===
Similar to carbenes and other Group 14 congeners, plumbylenes have been shown to undergo insertion reactions, specifically into C–X (X = Br, I) and Group 16 E–E (E = S, Se) bonds.

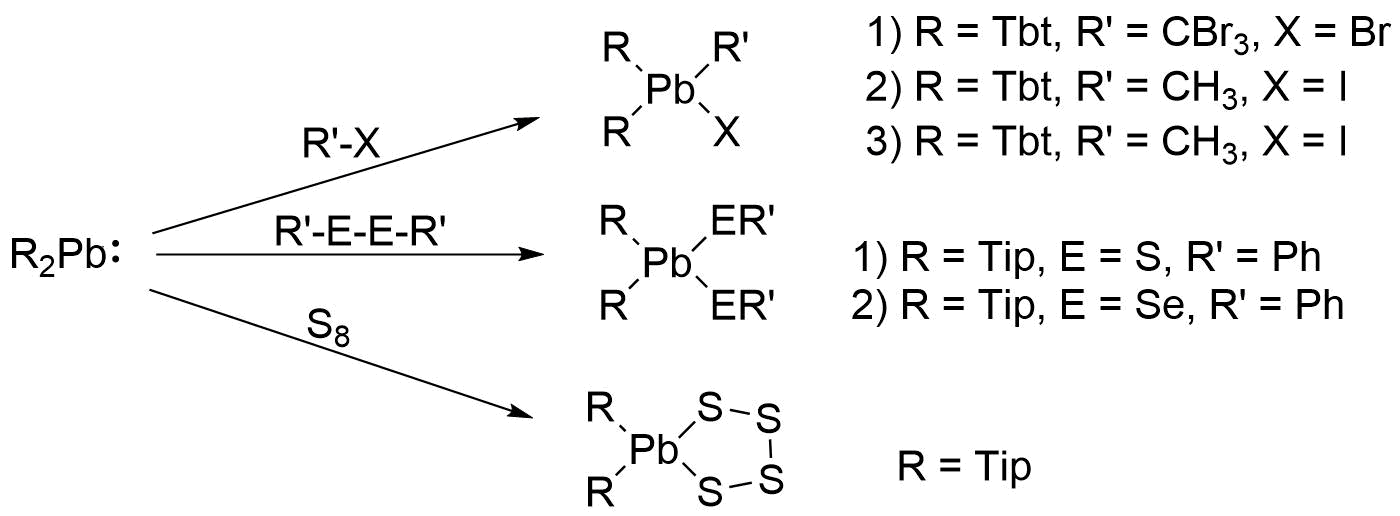
Insertion reactions of R_{2}Pb with R'–X (X = Br, I), R'–E–E–R' (E = S, Se) and S_{8}

Insertions into lead-substituent bonds can also occur.^{27} In the examples below, insertion is accompanied by intramolecular rearrangement to place more electron-donating heteroatoms next to the electron-deficient lead.^{27}

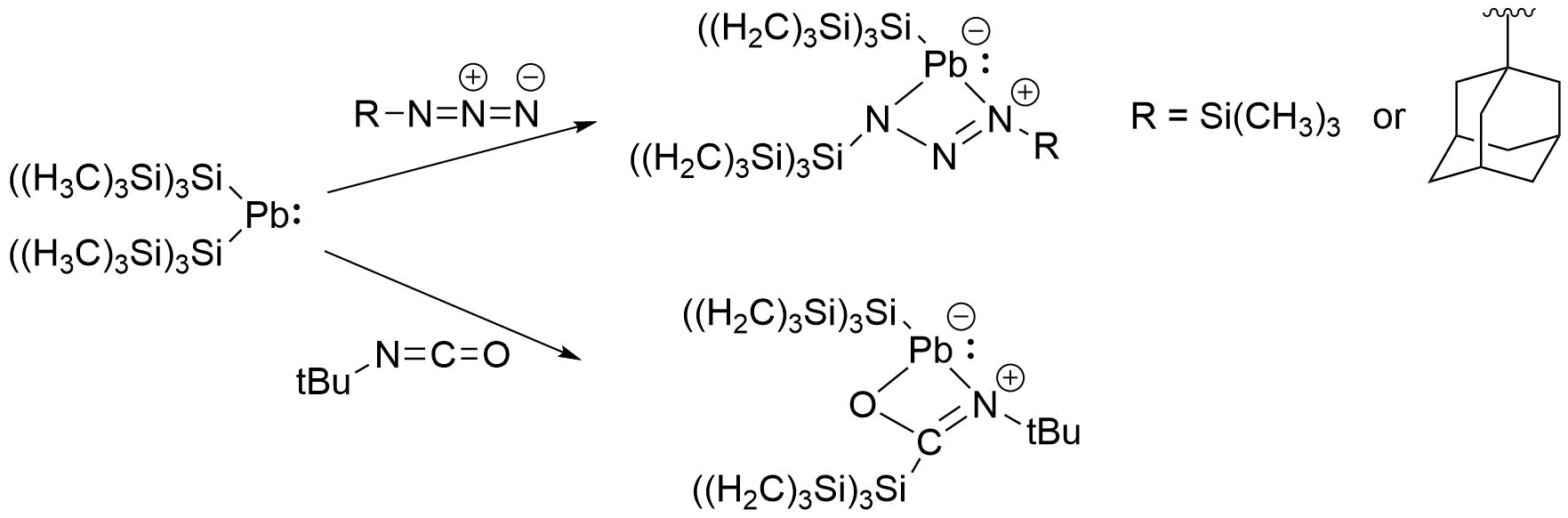
Insertion of an alkylazide and an isocyanate into [(Si(CH_{3})_{3})_{3}Si]_{2}Pb

=== Transmetallation ===
Plumbylenes are known to undergo nucleophilic substitution with organometallic reagents to form transmetallated products.^{28} In an unusual example, the use of TlPF_{6}, bearing the weakly coordinating anion PF_{6}^{−}, led to the formation of crystals of an oligonuclear lead compound with a chain structure upon work-up, highlighting the interesting reactivity of plumbylenes.^{28}

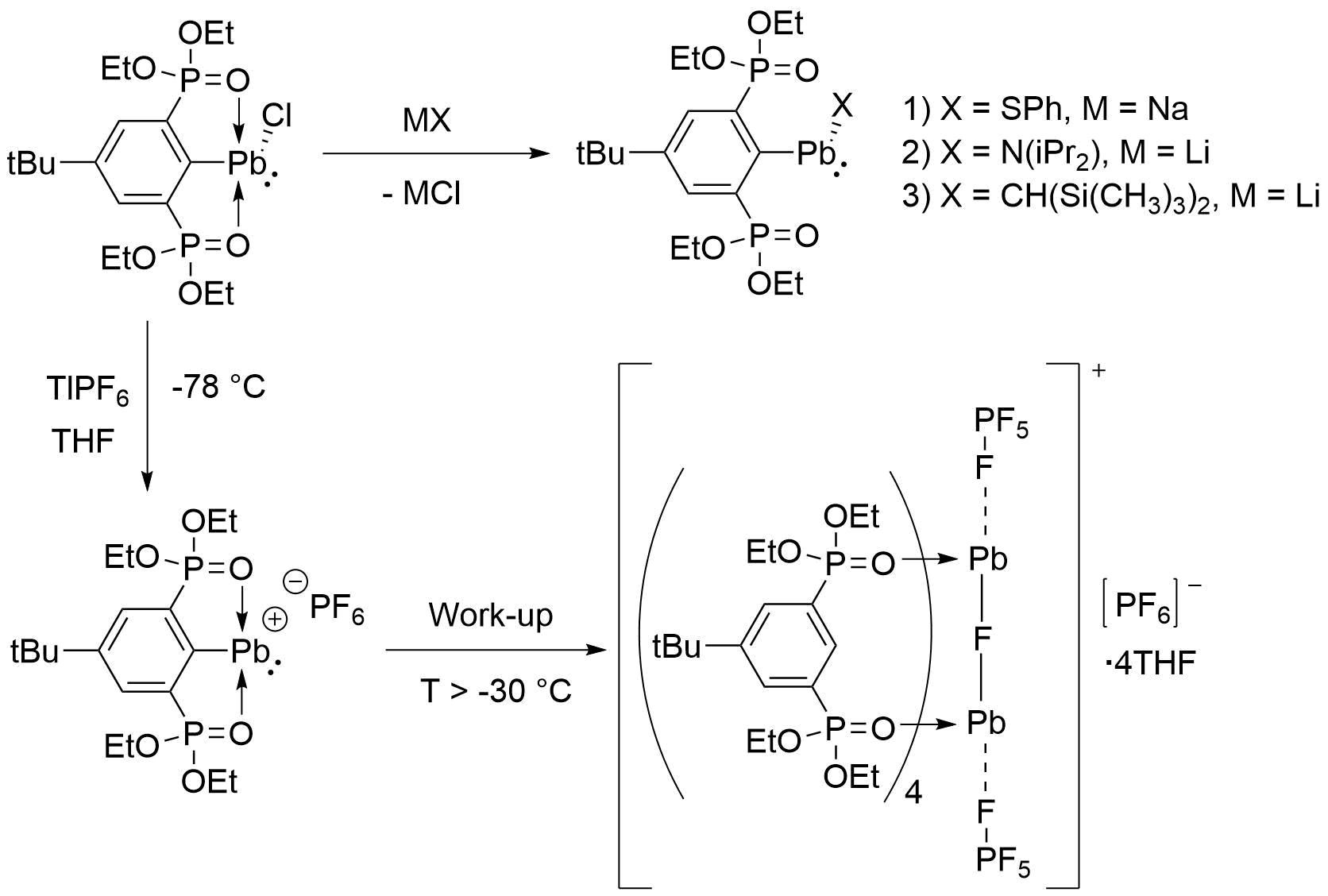
Transmetallation between a plumbylene and various organometallic reagents (top) and the formation of an unusual oligomeric chain compound (bottom)

In addition, plumbylenes can also undergo metathesis with group 13 E(CH_{3})_{3} (E = Al, Ga) compounds.

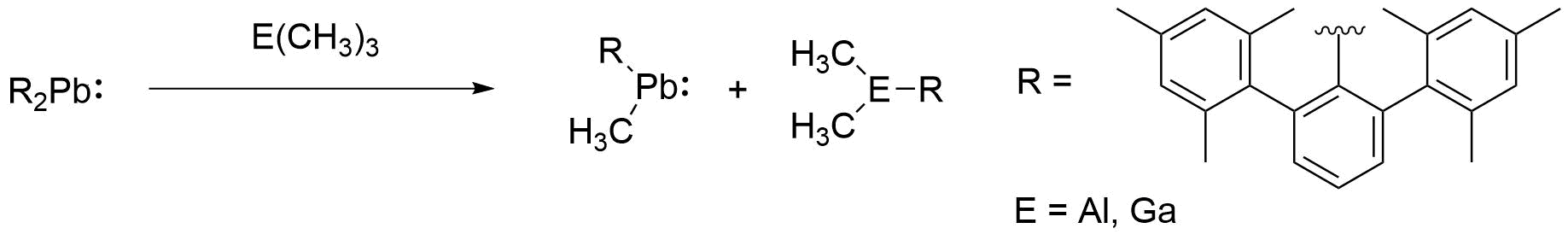
Metathesis reaction between R_{2}Pb and E(CH_{3})_{3} (E = Al, Ga). In this example, the plumbylene formed dimerizes into a diplumbene

Plumbylenes bearing different substituents can also undergo transmetallation and exchange substituents, with the driving force being the relief of steric strain and the low Pb-C bond dissociation energy.

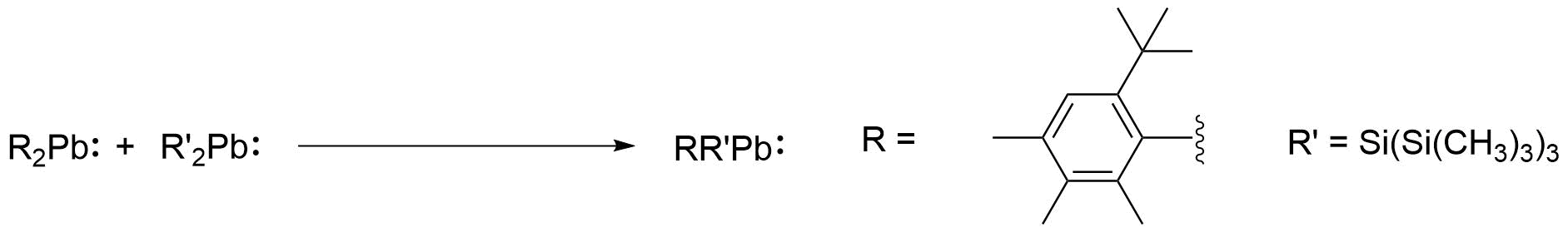
Transmetallation reaction between R_{2}Pb and R’_{2}Pb

== Applications ==
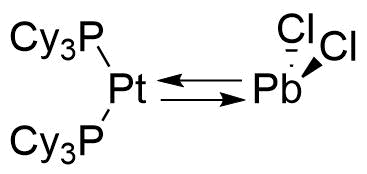
Synergic σ-donor-σ-acceptor interactions of PbCl_{2} with Pt(PCy_{3})_{2}

Plumbylenes can be used as concurrent σ-donor-σ-acceptor ligands to metal complexes, functioning as σ-donor via its filled 6s orbital and σ-acceptor via its empty 6p orbital.

Room temperature-stable plumbylenes have also been suggested as precursors in chemical vapour deposition (CVD) and atomic layer deposition (ALD) of lead-containing materials. Dithioplumbylenes and dialkoxyplumbylenes may be useful as precursors for preparing the semiconductor material lead sulphide and piezoelectric PZT respectively.
