= Colin Pillinger =

English planetary scientist

Colin Pillinger CBE FRS FRAS FRGS
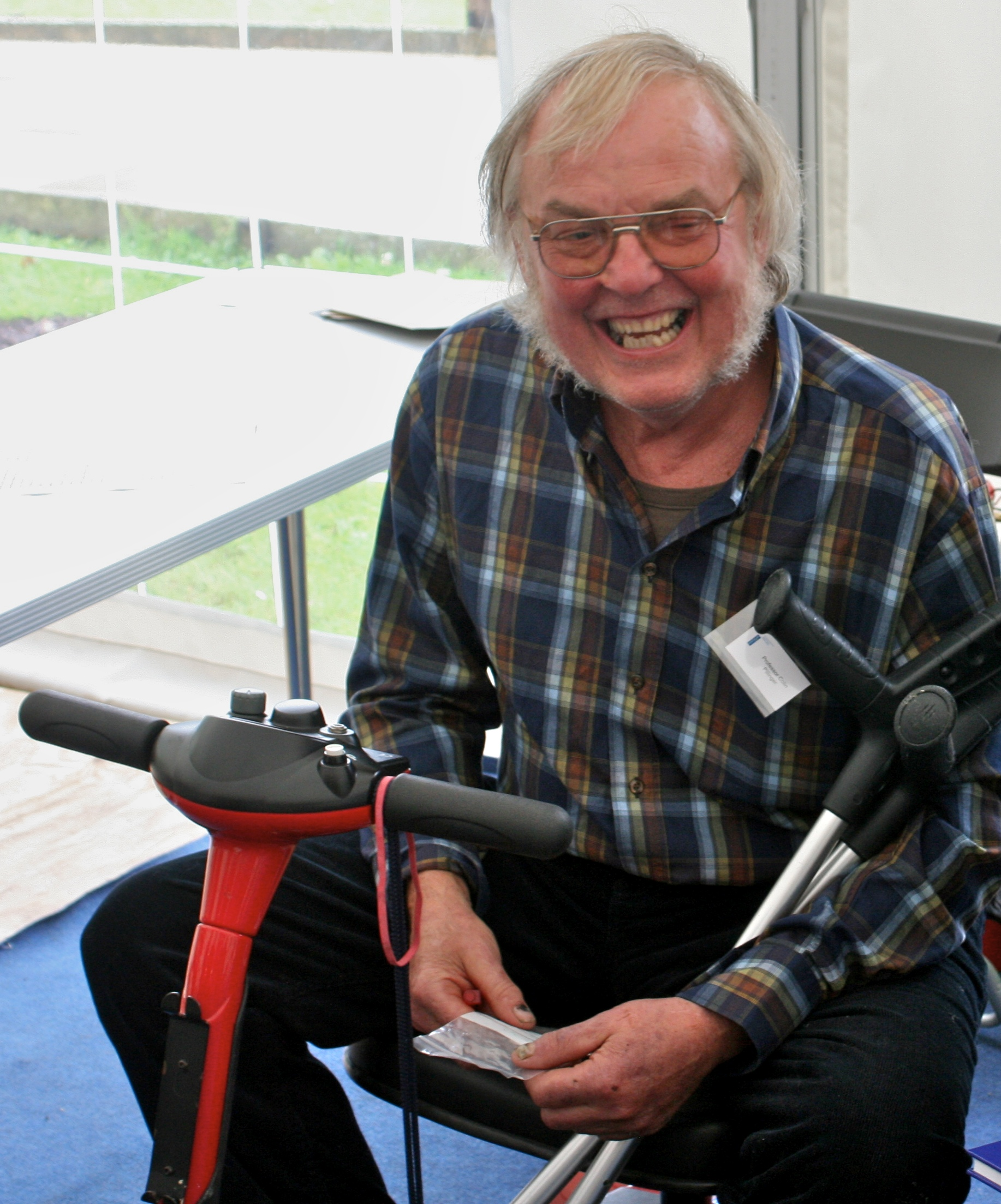
- At Jodrell Bank Observatory in 2009
- Born: Colin Trevor Pillinger; 9 May 1943; Kingswood, Gloucestershire, England
- Died: 7 May 2014 (aged 70); Cambridge, England
- Education: University College of Swansea (BSc, PhD)
- Known for: Beagle 2 Mars lander Analyzing Apollo lunar samples
- Awards: Michael Faraday Prize (2011)
- Scientific career
- Fields: Planetary science
- Workplaces: The Open University; University of Cambridge; University of Bristol; Gresham College
- Thesis: Studies on the nuclear magnetic resonance and mass spectroscopy (1968)
- Doctoral advisor: James Ballantine

Colin Trevor Pillinger, CBE FRS FRAS FRGS (/ˈpɪlɪndʒər/; 9 May 1943 – 7 May 2014) was an English planetary scientist. He was a founding member of the Planetary and Space Sciences Research Institute at The Open University in Milton Keynes; he was also the principal investigator for the British Beagle 2 Mars lander project, and worked on a group of Martian meteorites.

== Education and early life ==
Pillinger was born on 9 May 1943 in Kingswood, South Gloucestershire, just outside Bristol. His father, Alfred, a manual worker for the Gas Board, and his mother, Florence (née Honour), also had a daughter, Doreen (the local historian D.P. Lindegaard), six years Colin's senior. He attended Kingswood Grammar School, and later graduated with a BSc degree and a PhD degree in chemistry from University College of Swansea (now Swansea University). He said of himself, "I was a disaster as a science student".

== Career and research ==
After graduating from university, Pillinger became a senior research associate in the Department of Earth Science at the University of Cambridge, and then a senior research fellow at The Open University (1984–1990). He became a professor in interplanetary science at The Open University in 1991.

Pillinger's first job was working for NASA. He was involved in the Apollo space programme and ESA's Rosetta mission, and analysed the lunar samples brought back by Apollo 11.

Between 1996 and 2000, Pillinger was made Gresham Professor of Astronomy at Gresham College, a position once held by Sir Christopher Wren. He said of his appointment as professor of astronomy:

"As an organic chemist, turned geologist, turned astronomer who uses isotopic analyses to unravel the origins of life, our planet, the solar system and the stars, I hope I have something in common with the versatile men who were early Gresham Professors. The subjects which I research already enjoy popular interest; by combining them to produce a story of life told from the genealogy of its elements, my aim is to appeal to the widest possible audience, using an interdisciplinary approach to attempt to unravel the time-honoured puzzle, where do I come from?"

Pillinger is credited with inspiring many people to take an interest in space science, particularly in Britain. He was responsible for training and supporting a large number of experts in the field as well as helping to unite the space science and industrial communities in the UK. Pillinger worked as a conference and after-dinner speaker for the JLA agency.

To demonstrate his appetite for sharing his research and promoting the public understanding of science, Pillinger laid claim to the phrase "The only thing that increases in value if you share it is knowledge".

In 2000, a main belt asteroid was named 15614 Pillinger after Colin Pillinger. In the 2003 Queen's Birthday Honours list, he was appointed a Commander of the Order of the British Empire (CBE) for services to higher education and to science. Pillinger played a role in the Philae lander that was part of the Rosetta mission which successfully made its rendezvous with comet 67P/Churyumov–Gerasimenko in 2014. In particular he was an advocate of the idea of deploying the lander Philae to conduct scientific experiments in situ, and was instrumental in getting the Ptolemy device accepted as part of the science payload.

=== Beagle 2 ===
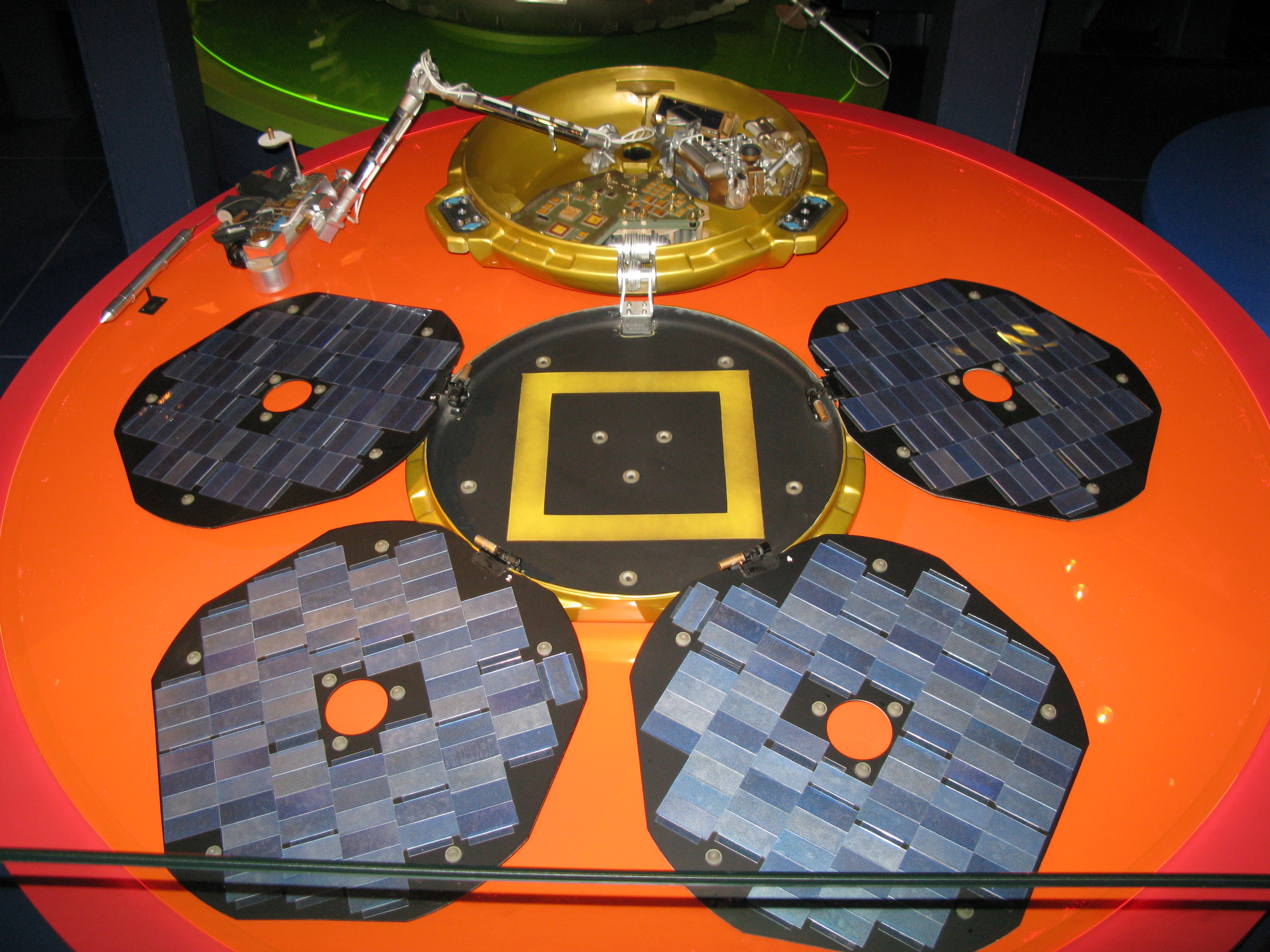
Replica of Beagle 2 in the London Science Museum.

Pillinger was the principal investigator for Beagle 2 Mars lander project, part of European Space Agency's (ESA) 2003 Mars Express mission. Initially considered a failure, it has since come to light that the space craft did successfully touch down on the surface of Mars. The UK Space Agency on 16 January 2015 indicated that Beagle 2 had indeed reached the surface of Mars on 25 December 2003, but had failed to deploy fully. Images taken by the HiRISE camera on NASA's Mars Reconnaissance Orbiter (MRO) identified clear evidence for the lander and convincing evidence for key entry and descent components on the surface of Mars within the expected landing area of Isidis Planitia (an impact basin close to the equator).

Analysis of the images of the landing site taken by a Mars orbiter in 2015 suggested that three of the four solar panels may have been successfully opened. As the transmitter was underneath the fourth panel, the lander failed to communicate back to Earth.

When the lander was first considered 'lost' a number of possible explanations were given by David Southwood, ESA's director of Science. The commission inquiring into the mission's apparent failure also apportioned blame towards Pillinger's management of the overall project as a contributing factor. In response, in his autobiography, Professor Pillinger highlighted a lack of support from key figures at ESA as a factor.

It was Pillinger's wife who thought of the Beagle 2 name for the project, based on Charles Darwin's ship HMS Beagle.

Pillinger enlisted British rock band Blur to write a song to be Beagle 2's call sign back home. It was to be broadcast as soon as Beagle 2 began work on the surface of Mars. He also persuaded the artist Damien Hirst to provide a spot painting to use in calibrating the spacecraft's camera.

In 2014, a science destination for the Mars rover Opportunity on the western rim of Endeavour Crater was named Pillinger Point after Colin Pillinger, in commemoration of his enthusiasm for the Beagle 2 mission.

=== Pillinger in popular culture ===
Beagle 2 has been mentioned in Hollywood films The Transformers: The Movie (and in the prequel Transformers: Beginnings comic) and Pillinger's work on asteroid impacts in Jurassic Park. A missing British Mars spacecraft was the subject of the 2005 Doctor Who Christmas Special. Pillinger appeared in Top Gear season 3 episode 7 and won a contest based on the best burnout. Beagle 2 featured in a science fiction story by Stephen Baxter and as one of the subjects in The Backroom Boys by Frances Spufford. Colin Pillinger was one of the guests talking about the planet Mars for In Our Time, broadcast on BBC Radio 4 on 11 January 2007.

In 2026, a series of thirteen plaques were unveiled across the UK, to celebrate the Beagle 2 mission. One plaque was installed in the M Shed at Bristol, to mark Pillinger's achievements and the connection to his home town of Kingswood, Bristol.

=== Awards and honours ===
Chronology of qualifications, career, and awards:

- 1965: BSc (Chemistry) from University College of Swansea
- 1968: PhD (Chemistry) from University College of Swansea
- 1968: Postdoctoral research fellow, University of Bristol Department of Chemistry
- 1974: Research Associate, at the University of Cambridge
- 1976: Senior Research Associate, Department of Earth Sciences, University of Cambridge
- 1981: Fellow of the Royal Astronomical Society
- 1981: Member of the British Mass Spectrometry Society
- 1984: Honorary DSc (Chemistry) from University of Bristol
- 1984: Senior Research Fellow, Department of Earth Science, The Open University
- 1986: Fellow of the Meteoritical Society
- 1991: Appointed Professor of Planetary Sciences at The Open University
- 1993: Member of the International Astronomical Union
- 1993: Fellow of the Royal Geographical Society
- 1993: Elected a Fellow of the Royal Society
- 1996: Professor of Astronomy at Gresham College in the City of London (until 2000)
- 2000: Main belt asteroid 15614 Pillinger named after Pillinger.
- 2003: Aston Medal
- 2003: appointed Commander of the Order of the British Empire (CBE)
- 2003: Winner Top Gear series 3's Brain Box Burnout
- 2011: recipient of the Michael Faraday Prize

=== Publications ===
- Beagle – from Sailing Ship to Mars Spacecraft (2003) ISBN 978-0-571-22323-7
- Space is a Funny Place (Barnstorm Productions, 2007). ISBN 978-0-9537263-9-4.
- My Life on Mars – The Beagle 2 Diaries (2010) ISBN 978-0-9506597-3-2

== Personal life ==
Pillinger's widow, Judith, is also a scientist. They met when working in the same laboratory and had two children, a son, Nicolas Joseph, and a daughter, Shusanah Jane, who in 2015 became the first solo British woman to complete the Race Across America ultra-endurance cycle race.

After experiencing difficulty with walking for two years, Pillinger was diagnosed with progressive multiple sclerosis in May 2005. He owned a dairy farm, but towards the end of his life his illness prevented him from doing physical work on the farm. Pillinger died two days before his 71st birthday at Addenbrooke's Hospital in Cambridge on 7 May 2014, after having a brain haemorrhage and falling into a coma.
