= Andrew Pelter =

British chemist (1931–2019)

Professor Andrew Pelter FRSC FLSW
- Born: 20 November 1931; London, England
- Died: 16 March 2019 (aged 87)
- Education: Bristol University
- Occupations

Swansea University Head of the Department of Chemistry
- In office 1985–1987
- Preceded by: John Howard Purnell
- Succeeded by: John Howard Purnell

Personal details
- Born: 20 November 1931
- Spouse: Susan Smith (m. 1994)
- Children: 5
- Scientific career
- Fields: Organic Chemist
- Workplaces: Medical Research Council, Manchester University, Swansea University
- Doctoral advisor: Professor W. D. Ollis
- Notable students: Bakthan Singaram, Keith Smith

Andrew Pelter FRSC FLSW (20 November 1931 – 16 March 2019) was a British organic chemist.

== Life ==
Pelter was born in London and studied chemistry at Bristol University, where he also gained his PhD degree under the supervision of Professor W. D. Ollis. He was married three times, most recently to Susan Smith on 22 January 1994.

== Career ==
Pelter started his career at the Medical Research Council working under John Cornforth which was a major influence on his professional development. He then move to Manchester University where he started his independent academic career, collaborating initially with Australian chemist, A. J. Birch. In 1971, Pelter became a professor of Organic Chemistry when he moved to University College of Swansea, he delivered his Inaugural lecture entitled Organic chemistry, a perspective view on 5 December 1972. He remained at Swansea until his retirement in 1999.

== Honours ==
He was awarded the Tilden Prize of the Royal Society of Chemistry in 1981 for his work on boron research.
