= Ernest Edward Ayling =

British chemist

Ernest Edward Ayling (1900–1960) AKC, FRIC was a British chemist.

== Life and career ==
Ayling studied for an MSc in chemistry at King's College under Leonard Eric Hinkel in 1926. He was a lecturer at the University College of Swansea between 1920 and 1960. He served for 21 years as the Hon Secretary of the South Wales Section of the Royal Institute of Chemistry until 1959. The E. E. Ayling Prize in Chemistry was created in his memory by Swansea University using a donation from colleagues, students and friends of £182 8s. 6d, it was awarded annually by the University Senate on the recommendation of the Professor of Chemistry, to the candidate, who attains the highest standard in the honours examination in chemistry. The first award was made in 1963 to J.E.D. Davies and consisted of £5 to spend on books.

== Recipients of the E. E. Ayling Prize in Chemistry ==
- 1963: J.E.D. Davies
- 1964 Miss J.O. Thomas
- 1965: P.G. Barker
- 1966: R.B. Mallion
- 1967: G.J. Thomas
- 1968: M.L. Kent
- 1969: B. Cox
- ...
- 1999: B. Perry
- ...
- 2003: M. Truman
- 2004: R. Talbot and D. Phillips

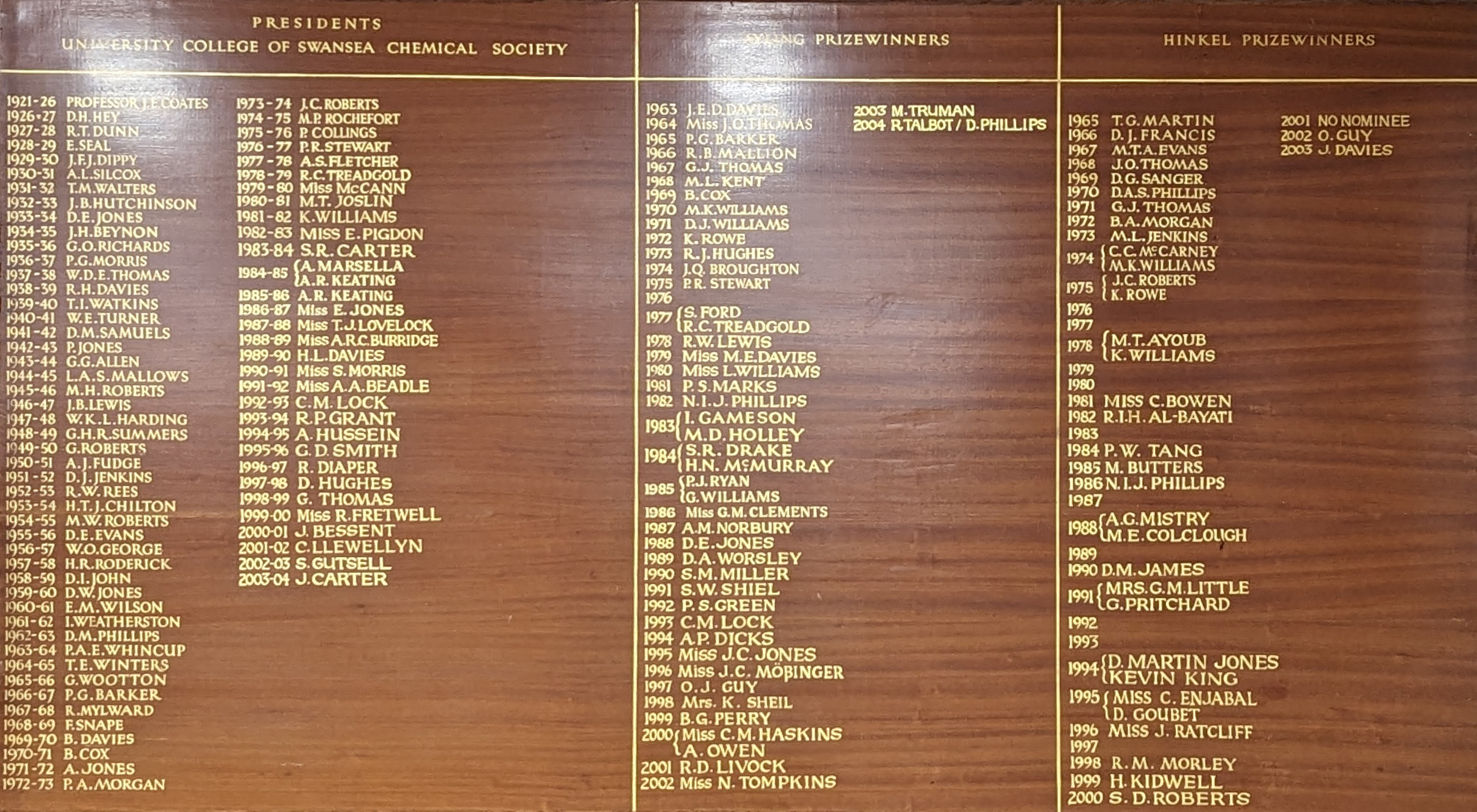
Ayling Prize in Chemistry
