= Philip Power =

American chemist

Philip Power FRS
- Born: April 1953 (age 73)
- Education: Trinity College Dublin (B.A.); University of Sussex (Ph.D.)
- Scientific career
- Fields: Chemistry
- Workplaces: Stanford University (1978–1980); University of California, Davis (1981–present)
- Thesis: Steric effects in group 4B and 5B metal aklyls and amides (1977)
- Doctoral advisor: Michael F. Lappert
- Website: chemistry.ucdavis.edu/people/philip-power

Philip Patrick Power (born April 1953) is an American chemist who is a Distinguished Professor of Chemistry at the University of California, Davis. He has contributed to the synthesis, structure, and physical and chemical characterization of inorganic and organometallic compounds. His research focuses on low-coordinate main group and transition metal compounds. Much of this work hinges on the use of sterically crowded ligands to stabilize unusual geometries.

The structure of [CrC_{6}H_{3}-2,6-(C_{6}H_{3}-2,6-(^{i}Pr)_{2})_{2}]_{2} prepared by Power et al.

== Education ==
Philip Power obtained a B.A. from Trinity College Dublin in 1974 and a Ph.D. from University of Sussex in 1977 (under Michael F. Lappert). He was a postdoctoral coworker under Richard H. Holm at Stanford University (1978–1980). In 1981 he was appointed to the faculty of UC Davis, where he is Distinguished Professor.

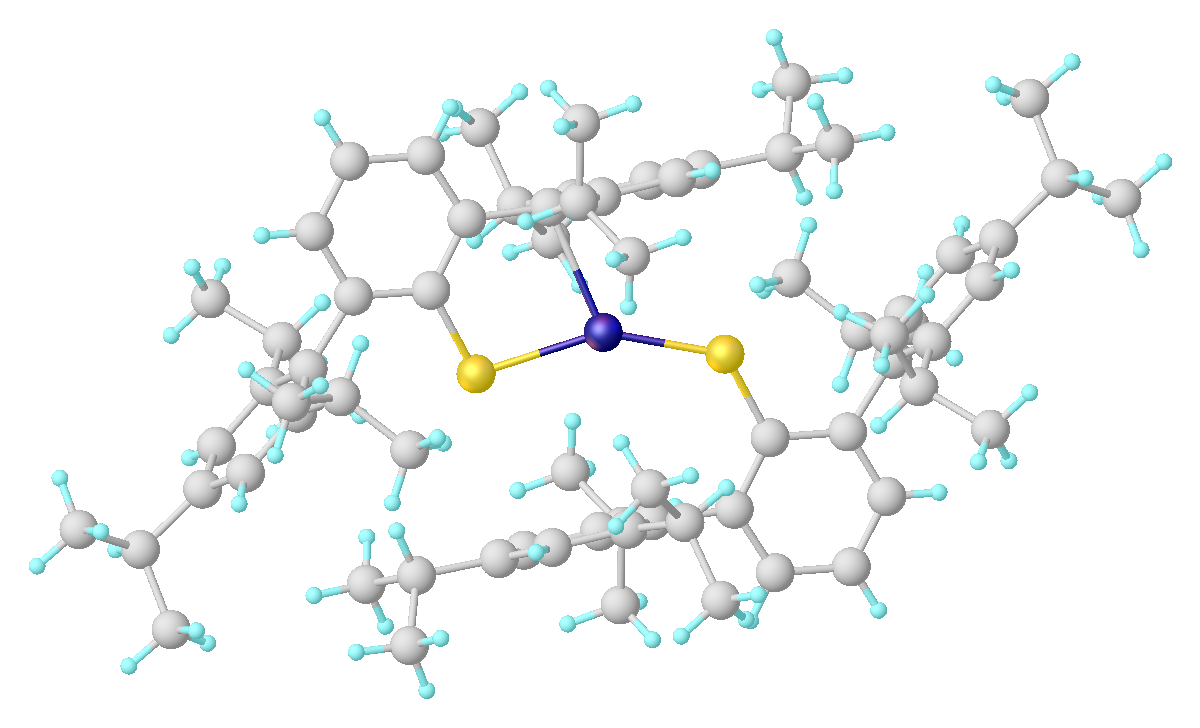
Structure of the quasi-two-coordinate ferrous dithiolate Fe[SC_{6}H_{3}-2,6-(C_{6}H_{2}-2,4,6-(^{i}Pr)_{3})_{2}]_{2}. A weak Fe-C(ipso) bond is indicated by the Fe---C distance of 2.427(1) Å. The structure illustrates the low coordination numbers enabled by bulky ligands.

== Awards ==
- Alexander von Humboldt Award, 1992
- Faculty Research Lecturer, University of Iowa, 1993
- Distinguished Visiting Professor, University of Auckland, New Zealand, 1993
- Reilly Lectureship, University of Notre Dame, 1995
- Werner Lectureship, Trinity College Dublin, 1996
- Membership of Editorial Advisory Board of Organometallics, Inorganic Chemistry, Dalton Transactions, Canadian Journal of Chemistry, Heteroatom Chemistry, Journal of Organometallic Chemistry, Polyhedron
- Ludwig Mond Award Royal Society of Chemistry, 2004
- Associate editor, Inorganic Chemistry, 2004
- Sloan Foundation Fellow, 1985–1989
- F. A. Cotton Award in Synthetic Inorganic Chemistry, American Chemical Society, 2005
- Fellow of the Royal Society, 2005
- ACS Award in Organometallic Chemistry, 2011
- Honorary Doctorate of Science, University of Bath, 2016
