= Organolead chemistry =

Study of chemical compounds with a carbon-lead bond

Organolead chemistry is the scientific study of the synthesis and properties of organolead compounds, which are organometallic compounds containing a chemical bond between carbon and lead.

Although sharing the same group with carbon, lead exhibits very different chemistry mainly due to the weakness of the Pb-C bond. Going down the carbon group the C–X (X = C, Si, Ge, Sn, Pb) bond becomes weaker and the bond length larger. The C–Pb bond in tetramethyllead is 222 pm long with a dissociation energy of 49 kcal/mol (204 kJ/mol). For comparison the C–Sn bond in tetramethyltin is 214 pm long with dissociation energy 71 kcal/mol (297 kJ/mol). The inert-pair effect is also relevant

By far the organolead compound that has had the greatest impact is tetraethyllead, a controversial chemical once heavily used as an antiknock agent in gasoline.

== Classes ==
=== Lead(IV) ===
Structure of [PbCl_{2}(C_{6}H_{5})_{3}]^{−}. Selected distances: Pb-Cl = 273, Pb-C = 220 picometer Color code: green = Cl-, black = C, gray = Pb.

The dominance of Pb(IV) in organolead chemistry contrasts with inorganic lead compounds, which tend to have Pb(II) centers.

The most common organolead compound is tetraethyllead, which was once widely used additive for gasoline. It is prepared by reaction of lead-sodium alloy with ethyl chloride. This compound was produced on the largest scale of all organometallic compounds: 365,200 ton/y in 1970. It is colorless, steam-distillable liquid.

Organolead compounds can also be derived more classically, e.g., from Grignard reagents and lead(II) chloride. These preparations almost always involve disproportionation:

2 PbCl_{2} + 4 RMgCl → PbR_{4} + Pb + 4 MgCl_{2}

For example, methylmagnesium chloride reacts with lead(II) chloride to tetramethyllead, a water-clear liquid with boiling point 110 °C and density 1.995 g/cm^{3}.

An example of a lead carbide is tetraplumbylmethane is (Br(C_{6}H_{5})_{2}Pb)_{4}C.

Organolead halides and pseudohalides are of the type R_{n}PbX_{(3-n)}, sulfinates (R_{n}Pb(OSOR)_{(3−n)}), and hydroxides (R_{n}Pb(OH)_{(3−n)}). Typical preparations of such compounds are shown:

R_{4}Pb + HCl → R_{3}PbCl + RH
R_{4}Pb + SO_{2} → R_{3}PbO(SO)R
2 R_{3}PbCl + Ag_{2}O + H2O → 2 R_{3}PbOH + 2 AgCl
R_{2}PbCl_{2} + 2 NaOH → R_{2}Pb(OH)_{2} + 2 NaCl

The organolead(IV) halides tend to be Lewis acidic, illustrated by the polymeric structure of fact that solid triphenyllead chloride, featuring pentacordinate lead.

A variety of organolead triacetates are available by the arylation of lead(IV) acetate, examples of electrophilic aromatic substitution. The reaction is illustrated with the plumbation of anisole:

CH_{3}OC_{6}H_{5} + Pb(OAc)_{4} → CH_{3}OC_{6}H_{4}Pb(OAc)_{3} + HOAc

=== Lead(II) ===
Organolead(II) compounds are rare. Simple dialkyls of Pb(II), called plumbylenes, are few and require special substituents. One bulky derivative is Pb(CH(Si(CH_{3})_{3})_{2})_{2}, a diamagnetic compound that dissolves to give a purple monomer.

Reaction of a lead(II) source with sodium cyclopentadienide gives plumbocene, Pb(C_{5}H_{5})_{2}.

Hexaphenyldilead is reduced by lithium to give the Pb(II) derivative:

(C_{6}H_{5})_{6}Pb_{2} + 2 Li → 2 LiPb(C_{6}H_{5})_{3}

=== Pb-Pb bonded compounds ===
The first organolead compound, hexaethyldilead (Pb_{2}(C_{2}H_{5})_{6}) was reported in 1853. Featuring a Pb-Pb bond, it was prepared in impure form by treatment of lead-sodium alloy with ethyl iodide. The reaction of Grignard reagents with lead(II) chloride can give hexaorganodilead derivatives. When the goal of the alkylation is the tetraalkyl derivative, impurities of hexaalkyldilead compounds can be removed by heating to induce disproportionation:

2 Pb_{2}(C_{2}H_{5})_{6} -> 3 Pb(C_{2}H_{5})_{4} + Pb

The preparation of hexaaryldilead compounds is well developed. The proposed stoichiometry for their preparation is proposed as follows:

3 PbCl_{2} + 6 ArMgCl → Pb_{2}Ar_{6} + 6 MgCl_{2} + Pb (Ar = aryl)

Triphenyllead(III) compounds can be prepared from LiPb(C_{6}H_{5})_{3}, prepared from hexaphenyldilead. This lithium compound is a precursor to unsymmetrical dilead compounds and, using triphenyltin chloride, a lead-tin derivative:

LiPb(C_{6}H_{5})_{3} + (CH_{3}C_{6}H_{4})_{3}PbCl → (CH_{3}C_{6}H_{4})_{3}Pb−Pb(C_{6}H_{5})_{3} + LiCl
LiPb(C_{6}H_{5})_{3} + (C_{6}H_{5})_{3}SnCl → (C_{6}H_{5})_{3}Sn−Pb(C_{6}H_{5})_{3} + LiCl

Several diplumbenes (formula: R_{2}Pb=PbR_{2}) are known. The presence of a double bond between the lead centers is debated.

A lead analogue of an alkyne, so-called diplumbynes, is known in the form of ArPbPbAr (Ar = C_{6}H_{3}-2,6-(C_{6}H_{2}-2,4,6-(i-Pr_{3})_{2}}}. According to X-ray crystallography, such compounds are described as Pb(I) derivatives with a single Pb-Pb bond.

== Applications ==
Organolead compounds have only limited commercial value. A number of triphenyllead compounds are used as preservatives, pesticides, and lubricant additives. Aviation fuels (avgas) for piston engines still contain significant amounts of lead.

== Safety ==
Organolead compounds are all toxic, which has limited their commercial applications. The once widespread use of tetraethyllead is an example of an environmental catastrophe.
