= Suresh Bhargava =

Indian-Australian Chemical Engineer

Dist. Prof. Suresh K. Bhargava (AM)
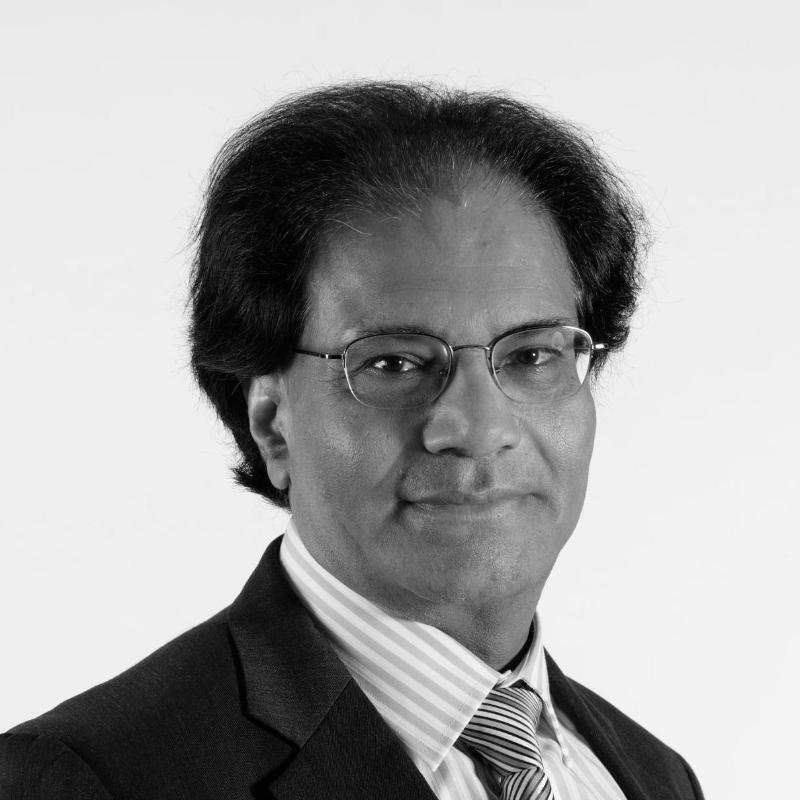
- Born: Meerut, Uttar Pradesh, India
- Occupation: Academic
- Spouse: Sunita Bhargava

Academic background
- Education: Exeter University, United Kingdom, PhD (1982)

Academic work
- Discipline: Chemistry/Chemical engineering
- Institutions: RMIT University

Suresh Bhargava is an Indian-Australian academic and multidisciplinary scientist specializing in chemical engineering. He is a distinguished professor at the Royal Melbourne Institute of Technology (RMIT), the founding director of the Centre for Advanced Materials and Industrial Chemistry (CAMIC), and the current Dean of Research & Innovation (India) in the STEM College at RMIT University, Melbourne. Prof. Bhargava is a fellow of ten academies worldwide, including the European Academy of Sciences (FEurAsc), the National Academy of Inventors (FNAI), the Australian Academy of Technology and Engineering (FTSE), the Indian National Academy of Engineering (FNAE), the American Association for the Advancement of Science (FAAAS), the Royal Society of Chemistry (FRSC), the Royal Australian Chemical Institute (FRACI), the National Academy of Sciences, India (FNASI), and The World Academy of Sciences (FTWAS-UNESCO). In 2021, he joined The World Academy of Sciences-UNESCO, and in 2022, he was appointed a Member of the Order of Australia.

== Early life and education ==
Bhargava was born and raised in Meerut, India. In 1972, he completed his master's degree and began his academic career as a chemistry lecturer at his alma mater, IP College Bulandshahr, Meerut University College. In 1979, he was the sole chemistry scholar selected from India for the Commonwealth Academic Scholarship, which enabled him to pursue his PhD under the guidance of E.W. Abel at the University of Exeter. In 2009, he was honored with an honorary D.Sc. by Rajasthan University, with the award presented by the former president of India, Pratibha Patil, in recognition of his academic leadership and groundbreaking innovations in chemical technology.

== Career ==
Bhargava conferred his PhD in 1982. In 1983, he started a research fellow position at the Australian National University in Canberra, Australia where he became the first Hindi radio announcer until 1986. In 1987, he was invited as a visiting professor to the Indian Institute of Sciences, Bangalore, India. Throughout 1988 and 1990, he worked as a scientist for the Commonwealth Scientific and Industrial Research Organisation (CSIRO) in the fuel technology division at Lucas Heights. By the end of 1990, he joined RMIT University as a Senior Lecturer.

In 2011, Bhargava initiated a collaboration with the Indian Institute of Chemical Technology (IICT) in Hyderabad. This venture was made possible with support from the Government of India through the Council of Scientific and Industrial Research (CSIR) and RMIT University. This partnership led to a joint cotutelle PhD degree from RMIT and IICT. After the success of the IICT- RMIT University collaboration, in 2017, Bhargava initiated a unique award-winning joint PhD degree program between RMIT and the Academy of Scientific and Innovative Research of India (AcSIR) connecting RMIT with 39 leading national laboratories across India. This innovative RMIT-led research program was awarded the prestigious Victorian International Education Award for Excellence in Innovation, Partnership, and International Engagement in 2018. In 2022, aiming to complement the existing joint research program with AcSIR and CSIR-IICT, Bhargava founded a tripod model of global collaboration, joining RMIT University and CSIRO with the Bangladesh Council of Scientific and Industrial Research, called RMIT-CSIRO-BCSIR.

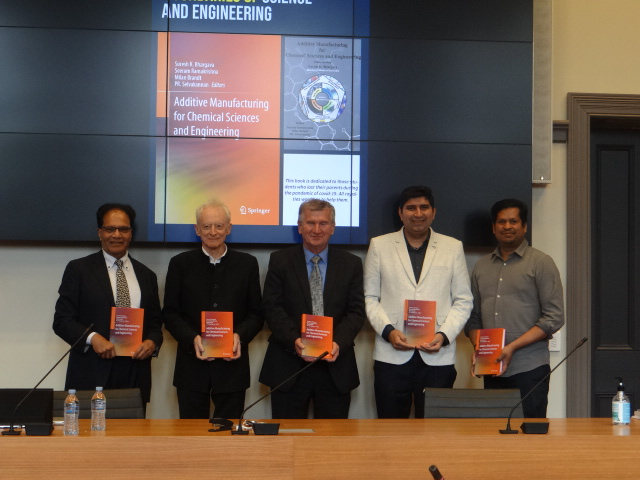
Release of the book 'Additive Manufacturing for Chemical Sciences and Engineering' at the celebration of CAMIC day, 2022.

Prof. Bhargava has authored over 600 articles, and 21 book chapters, 2 books, and has 9 patents awarded. He works in the fields of material science, Gold chemistry, Chemical sensing, and Industrial chemistry. Prof. Bhargava is the recipient of competitive and collaborative research grants at RMIT University (>$30 million over the last 20 years) from various sources including the ARC, AISRF, industry and CRC-P. This includes a highly competitive Australia-India Strategic Research Fund Grand Challenge ($6 million, success rate ~2%) for the project entitled: Mini DME: A custom-designed solution to bring stranded gas to energy markets (2013) in collaboration with the University of Melbourne, CSIRO, the Indian Institute of Petroleum (IIP), Indian Institute of Technology (IIT) Roorkee, and Bharat Petroleum from India.

== Legacy - Scientific and Technological Contribution ==
In 2010, Bhargava established a multidisciplinary research centre known as the Centre for Advance Materials and Industrial Chemistry (CAMIC) at RMIT University. Under Bhargava's leadership, the centre has developed several new products, synthesis methods and technologies that have been utilized by industry.

As a multidisciplinary research scientist, some of his landmark discoveries explore the properties of gold at the molecular level and nanoscale for sensing, catalysis, and biomedical applications. Scientific breakthroughs include the electrosynthesis of gold nano spikes, where he pioneered the chemical templating effect of lead ions for the synthesis of gold in conical morphology with selective exposure of crystal facets, and the mercury sensing exploring the amalgamation of mercury with gold forms the basis for his quartz crystal microbalance and surface acoustic wave-based mercury sensors. He has also pioneered unique solutions for mercury abatement from industrial exhausts and wastewater such as ceria-zirconia modified MnOx catalysts for mercury adsorption and oxidation and the use of waste oil for mercury removal, and innovated a 3-in-1 reusable mercury sensor which can remove mercury, detect it and allows the reuse of the sensor after regeneration.

Bhargava's research into gold science extends into molecular engineering. He created a library of important metal-organic compounds whose properties can be controlled at the atomic level. Researching different gold oxidation states in one complex, he explored their biological activities and identified potential for their use in anti-cancer applications, showing selective in-vitro activities as high as 200 times those of commercially available platinum drugs against prostate and cervical cancer cell lines.

Bhargava has also significantly contributed to environmental catalysis, such as catalytic wet oxidation (CWO) in strong alkaline solutions. Having successfully identified the mechanisms at work under these conditions, he was able to translate these fundamental findings into a new CWO technology to treat Bayer liquor for Alcoa’s refineries, addressing a more than $400 million loss in productivity per year. He published two patents and several seminal publications resulting from this work, including an invited refereed review.

With his interdisciplinary research, Bhargava has sought to bridge the gap between fundamental science and applied technology. An example of this is his collaborative research with IIT Bombay on the application of 3D printed catalysts and components for heat removal in hypersonic flights under the VAZARA fellowship. He has innovated a novel and highly efficient method for the green synthesis of soluble graphene from aqueous polyphenol extracts of eucalyptus bark in collaboration with Indian research partners and demonstrated its application in high-performance supercapacitors.

== Awards and Recognitions ==
S.No.	Award name	Importance of Award	Year
1	RMIT University Vice Chancellor’s Research Excellence Award	Excellence graduate supervision	2006
2	R. K. Murphy Medal	Industrial Chemistry Division's most prestigious award	2008
3	Excellence in Chemical Engineering award	IIChE awards 2010	2010
4	Ralph McIntosh Medal	Outstanding services to students	2011
5	Invention Disclosure Award	Inventing mercury sensing technology for industrial applications	2012
6	The prestigious Applied Research Award		2013
7	P. C. Ray Chair, awarded for his distinguished lecture series	Indian Science, Technology and Innovation	2014
8	RMIT University Vice Chancellor’s Research Excellence Award	Excellence graduate supervision	2014
9	CHEMECA medal	Highest honour in the Chemical Engineering profession in Australia and New Zealand	2015
10	Khwarizmi International Award (KIA)	Government of Iran and sponsored by UNESCO	2016
11	NRI Award	Best Non-resident Indian academic for Southern Pacific	2017
12	SASTRA-CNR Rao Award	A tribute to the renowned and influential Indian Chemist, Professor CNR Rao	2023
13	RMIT University Vice Chancellor’s Research Excellence Award	Excellence graduate supervision	2023
14	Lifetime Achievement Awards for Contributions to Industry-Research Collaboration	Cooperative Research Australia	2024
