= Harry Hallam =

Harry Hallam may refer to:

- Harry Hallam (football manager), football manager who managed Nottingham Forest, 1897–1909
- Harry Hallam (academic) (died 1977), chemist at the University College of Swansea

== See also ==
- Henry Hallam (1777–1859), English historian
- Henry Hallam (actor) (1850–1921), British-born operatic tenor and film actor
