= Rachel Evans =

British chemist

Rachel Evans FRSC FIMMM FLSW
- Born: Rachel Claire Evans
- Education: Swansea University (MChem, PhD)
- Awards: Marie Curie Fellowship; Dillwyn Medal (2017)
- Scientific career
- Fields: Materials chemistry Photophysics; Solar energy Soft matter Polymers
- Workplaces: University of Cambridge; Trinity College Dublin; University of Aveiro; University of Coimbra; Lonza Group
- Thesis: Efficient emitters for technological applications (2007)
- Website: www.msm.cam.ac.uk/people/evans

Rachel Claire Evans FRSC FIMMM FLSW is a Welsh chemist based at the University of Cambridge and a fellow of Jesus College, Cambridge. She works on photoactive polymer-hybrid materials for solar devices, including organic photovoltaics and stimuli-responsive membranes.

== Early life and education ==
Evans grew up in South Wales. She studied at Swansea University, earning a Master of Chemistry (MChem) degree in 2002. During her Masters, she completed an International Association for the Exchange of Students for Technical Experience (IASTE) fellowship at Lonza Group. She returned to Swansea University for her PhD, investigating on light-emitting materials for display technologies.

== Research and career ==
After her PhD, Evans spent a year at the University of Aveiro. She was subsequently awarded a Marie Curie Fellowship at the University of Paris where she worked as a postdoc on fluorescence of soft materials. Evans left Paris to join the University of Coimbra as a Fundação para a Ciência e Tecnologia postdoctoral fellow. She moved to Trinity College Dublin in 2009, where she was a lecturer in Physical Chemistry. Her research was funded by Science Foundation Ireland and Enterprise Ireland. She delivered the 2011 Royal Society of Chemistry Schools lecture on the Chemistry of Light. In 2013 she published the textbook Applied Photochemistry with Springer Publishing. They explored self-assembly of conjugated polyelectrolyte–polyoxometalate networks, with dimensions controlled by the polymer chain length and steric charge distribution. The self-assembly of these lumophores can be used to tune the optical and electronic properties. To understand the morphology of these films and inform the design of performance nanostructured devices, her group use small-angle scattering, spectroscopy and microscopy. Small-angle scattering allows her to study the microstructure of hybrid materials at the near atomic scale. Their conjugated polyelectrolyte work was featured in the ChemComm Emerging Investigators issue. She also worked on oxygen sensitive printable ink sensors.

Evans has explored polymer-hybrid materials for luminescent solar concentrators. By controlling the placement and orientation of the lumophore, she showed that it is possible to limit light lost by reabsorption. She minimises waveguiding losses by designing materials with high refractive indices. She demonstrated that perylene carboxdiimide-bridged triethoxysilane can be covalently grafted to siloxane hybrids. Her work was featured in the Journal of Materials Chemistry C Emerging Investigators Issue in 2016. She also develops encapsulation techniques to improve device lifetime. She was made an associate professor in 2016. She collaborated extensively with the University of Montpellier as part of a French-Irish collaboration.

Evans was appointed a lecturer at the University of Cambridge in 2017 and a fellow of Jesus College, Cambridge. Her group explore soft materials that are responsive to stimuli, nanostructured inks and hybrid nanoparticles. The soft materials respond to light, using photoresponsive surfactants that include an azobenzene group. She was appointed chair of the Royal Society of Chemistry Photophysics and Photochemistry Group in 2017.

She founded Senoptica Technologies in 2018 and is the chief scientific officer (CSO) working on optical sensors developed in Evans' lab. Senoptica Technologies detect defective modified atmosphere packaging, changing colour to alert the consumer to the amount of oxygen in the pack.

=== Awards and honours ===
2023 Elected a Fellow of the Learned Society of Wales (FLSW)

2018 Elected a Fellow of the Royal Society of Chemistry (FRSC)

2018 Nominated a Fellow of the Institute of Materials, Minerals and Mining (FIMMM)

2017 Royal Society of Chemistry (RSC) and Society of Chemical Industry UK Young Researchers Medal

2017 Learned Society of Wales Dillwyn Medal

2015 Trinity College Dublin Fellowship

2014 Irish Lab Awards Young Leader of the Year

2008 RSC Harry Hallam prize

2007 RSC Ronald Belcher Memorial Lectureship
