= Eddie Abel =

British chemist (1931–2021)

Eddie Abel CBE FRSC
- Born: Edward William Abel; 3 December 1931; Kenfig Hill, Wales
- Died: 19 April 2021 (aged 89); Cobham, England
- Resting place: Randalls Park Crematorium, Leatherhead
- Education: University of Wales, Cardiff; University of London
- Spouse: Margaret Rosina Edwards (m. 1960; died 2018)
- Children: 2
- Scientific career
- Fields: Inorganic chemistry; Organometallic chemistry
- Workplaces: Royal Society of Chemistry; Imperial College London; University of Bristol; University of Exeter
- Thesis: The preparation and properties of diphenylboronous acid and its derivatives. (1957)
- Doctoral advisor: Michael F. Lappert
- Other academic advisors: Howard Purnell
- Notable students: Suresh Bhargava

President of the Royal Society of Chemistry
- In office 1996-1998
- Preceded by: John Howard Purnell
- Succeeded by: Anthony Ledwith
- Edward Abel's voice recorded August 2013 at Burlington House

Edward William Abel CBE, FRSC (3 December 1931 – 19 April 2021) was a British chemist, editor of textbooks on organometallic chemistry and president of the Royal Society of Chemistry (1996–1998).

== Early life and education ==
Abel was born in Kenfig Hill, Bridgend County Borough, the son of Sidney John Abel and Donna Maria (née Grabham). He attended Bridgend County Grammar School, where he gained his Higher School Certificate in 1949. Abel went on to study chemistry at University of Wales, Cardiff, where he was an undergraduate student of Professor Howard Purnell. Following his graduation from Cardiff, he served with the British Army during the Korean War. He then pursued postgraduate studies at the Northern Polytechnic (now part of London Metropolitan University), supported by a Postgraduate Research Scholarship from the Courtaulds' Scientific and Educational Trust Fund, awarded in 1956. Under the supervision of Michael F. Lappert, Abel finished his PhD in just two years.

== Academic career ==
Following his PhD, Abel continued his research at Imperial College London, working as a post-doctoral research fellow in the laboratory of future Nobel laureate Geoffrey Wilkinson. In 1959, he joined University of Bristol as a lecturer and was later promoted to reader. In 1972, he became Professor of Inorganic Chemistry at University of Exeter. He was also Exeter's head of Chemistry from 1977 to 1988, and deputy-vice-chancellor from 1991 to 1994. Among his doctoral students at Exeter was Suresh Bhargava AM, now a Distinguished Professor of Chemistry who has enjoyed a successful career in Australia.

Throughout Abel's career, he also held visiting positions at University of British Columbia (1970), TU Braunschweig (1973), and Australian National University (1990). He served as President of the Royal Society of Chemistry from 1996 to 1998. Upon his retirement from Exeter in 1997, he was made Professor Emeritus.

=== Workplace incidents ===
In 1959 Abel was injured in an explosion at Imperial. "He received burns to his hands and cuts but his injuries [were] not thought to be serious" The explosion also blew off several windows as well as the door of Wilkinson's office, which was adjacent to Abel's lab.

Abel collapsed at work during his time at Exeter, as recalled by his student Bhargava. He was hospitalised following the incident but soon recovered.

=== Honours and recognitions ===
Abel was a Fellow of the Royal Society of Chemistry. He won the society's Tilden Prize for outstanding contributions to chemistry research in the 1980/81 academic year.

He was appointed a Commander of the Order of the British Empire (CBE) in the 1997 Queen's Birthday Honours, for services to chemistry. In 2000, he was awarded an honorary Doctor of Science degree from University of Exeter.

== Personal life and death ==
Abel married Margaret Rosina Edwards in Bridgend on 6 August 1960. They had a son and a daughter: Edward Christopher (1963) and Julia Margaret (1967) who, between them, have four grandchildren. Margaret Rosina Abel died on 4 February 2018. Eddie Abel died in Cobham on 19 April 2021. His funeral was held at Randall's Park Crematorium, Leatherhead on 18 May 2021.
