= John Howard Purnell =

Welsh chemist (1925–1996)

Professor John Howard Purnell OBE
- Born: 17 August 1925; Rhondda
- Died: 12 January 1996 (aged 70); Swansea
- Education: Cardiff University, University of Cambridge
- Known for: Chemistry, Gas Chromatography

Signature

4th & 5th Swansea University Head of Chemistry Department
- In office 1970–1984
- Preceded by: Cedric Hassall
- Succeeded by: Andrew Pelter
- In office 1988–1990
- Preceded by: Andrew Pelter
- Succeeded by: Keith Smith

President, Royal Society of Chemistry
- In office 1994–1996
- Succeeded by: Professor E.W. Abel

John Howard Purnell OBE FRSC (17 August 1925 Rhondda, South Wales — 12 January 1996 Swansea, Wales) was a Welsh chemist.

== Education ==
He attended Maes y Dderwen County School in Ystradgynlais before attending Pentre Secondary School.

After graduating with a first class honours in chemistry at University College, Cardiff in 1946 he went on to the University of Wales and received a PhD in 1952.

== Career ==
Purnell began to work in the field of gas chromatography in this field in 1952 at Cambridge University while working with Professor R. G. W. Norrish. In 1965 he became Professor of Physical Chemistry at University College, Swansea where he remained until his retirement in 1992.

He was president of the Royal Society of Chemistry between 1994 and 1996.

== Honors and awards ==
- 1971 Beilby Medal and Prize of the Royal Society of Chemistry
- 1992 Officer of the Order of the British Empire (OBE), 1992 New Year Honours
