= Leonard Eric Hinkel =

English chemist and academic (1882–1962)

Leonard Eric Hinkel FRIC
- Born: 15 November 1882; Croydon, England
- Died: 18 November 1962 (aged 80)
- Education: King's College London
- Known for: Organic Chemistry
- Scientific career
- Workplaces: King's College London, University College, Swansea

Leonard Eric Hinkel (15 November 1882 – 18 November 1962) was a British chemist and academic.

== Life and career ==
Hinkel a son of German parents was born in Croydon, England on 15 November 1882. He attended King's College London in 1900 and was awarded the Daniell Scholarship. Hinkel remained at King's College London first as a research associate under Professor J. M. Thomson and Sir Herbert Jackson and later under Professor A. W. Crossley. He became lecturer in 1912 and senior lecturer in 1919. In 1920, he moved to University College, Swansea as senior lecturer in organic chemistry in which he continued until his retirement in 1949.

In 1924, Hinkel was conferred a D.Sc. degree from the University of London.

He died on 18 November 1962.

== Prize ==
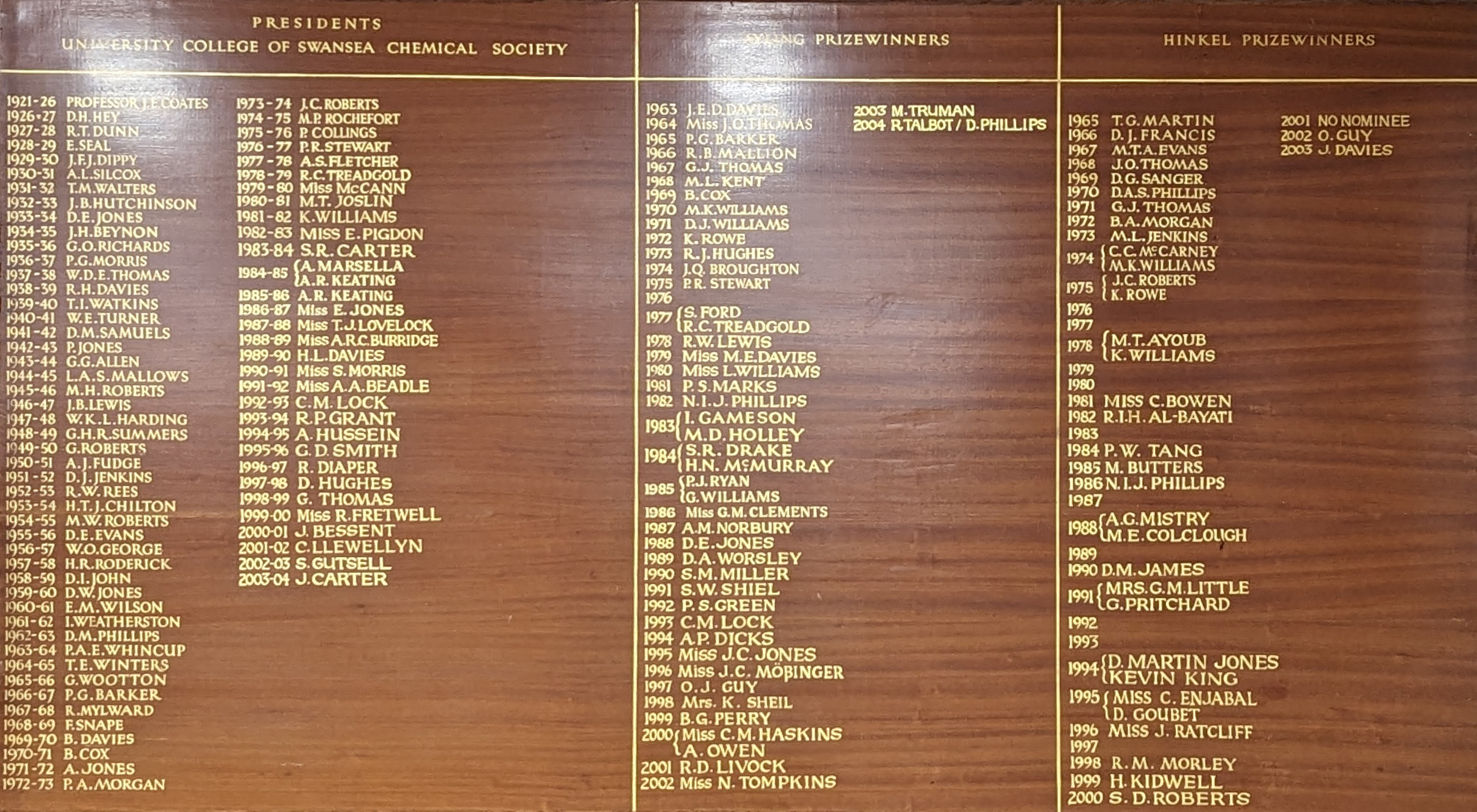
Hinkle Prizewinners

The Hinkel Prize was created and first awarded in 1965 in his memory.

- 1965: T.G. Martin
- 2003: J. Davies
