= Jim Ballantine (chemist) =

Scottish chemist (1934–2013)

Doctor James A Ballantine CChem FRS
- Born: 21 February 1934; England, UK
- Died: 30 April 2013 (aged 79); Singleton Hospital, Swansea, Wales, UK
- Education: Liverpool University
- Known for: Chemistry, Gas Chromatography, Mass Spectrometry
- Spouse: Betty Ballantine
- Children: Robert, Tony

Director of EPSRC UK National Mass Spectrometry Facility
- In office 1986–1998
- Preceded by: Office established
- Succeeded by: Dai Games

James A Ballantine CChem FRS (21 February 1934 – 30 April 2013) was a chemist and academic at Swansea University.

== Life and career ==
Ballantine was born in England but grew up in Scotland, he studied chemistry at Liverpool University and went on to complete his PhD. He started his career under Professor George Kenner with an ICI Post-doctoral Fellowship working on the synthesis of unsymmetrical porphyrins. In 1961, Ballantine took up a lectureship in Organic Chemistry at Swansea University, becoming Reader in 1981. Ballantine was the director of the Institute of Marine Studies at Swansea University, which he established in 1978, and was also the founding director of both the Environmental Monitoring Unit and EPSRC National Mass Spectrometry Service Centre. He retired in 1998.

Ballantine was an active member of the Royal Society of Chemistry, and he served for 23 years as the Hon Secretary and Treasurer of the South Wales West Local Section as well as in 1995 together with Bill Williams they gave the Science and Energy lecture all over Wales on some 800 occasions to some 80,000 pupils.
