= Bakthan Singaram =

Indian organic chemist

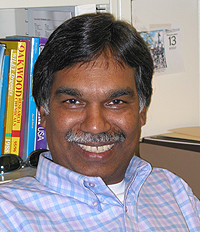
- Singaram in 2007
- Education: University of Madras
- Known for: Diisopinocampheylborane; TarB-X; LAB Reagent
- Scientific career
- Workplaces: Purdue University; University of California, Santa Cruz

Bakthan Singaram is a professor of organic chemistry at the University of California, Santa Cruz in Santa Cruz, California, where he has taught since 1989. Singaram's primary focus is in the area of boron-based organic chemistry. He gained his Ph.D. from the University of Madras, Tamil Nadu, India in 1977. Singaram also worked in and directed the laboratory of Nobel Prize-winning chemist Herbert Brown, who shared the 1979 Nobel prize in chemistry 1979 with Georg Wittig "for their development of the use of boron- and phosphorus-containing compounds, respectively, into important reagents in organic synthesis". Singaram then left the Brown research group to take a position as an assistant professor in 1989 at the University of California, Santa Cruz, where he remains today. Singaram has also acted as a visiting professor at several universities, such as the University of Puerto Rico and the University of Rennes 1 in Rennes, France. Most recently, he received an award from The Boron in the Americas (BORAM) Organization presented at the Regular BORAM Awards in June 2012.

== Research interests ==
Singaram's laboratory is interested in the synthesis and reactions in boron-containing molecules as well as in the development of asymmetric and stereoselective methods for the synthesis of organic molecules.

=== Sugar sensing ===
As of 2000, Singaram was developing a glucose sensor based on boronic acids which might lead to an implantable diagnostic tool for continuous glucose detection for persons afflicted with diabetes mellitus. Carbohydrates and their derivatives, including saccharides, phosphosugars, and nucleotides, are ubiquitous metabolites in every organism. Sensitive probes for monitoring the presence of these metabolites provide researchers a powerful tool to elucidate biological processes. Diabetics monitor glucose by testing blood four or more times a day, obtained from finger pricks or other sampling method. Glucose levels can fluctuate widely throughout the day, making it difficult to determine when it is important to test the blood. There has been no way to continuously monitor those fluctuations over long periods. Our group has extensively developed fluorescent probes for metabolites including glucose, phosphosugars, and nucleotides. We have developed a two-component optical probe with a modular receptor scaffold. This small molecule probe is water-soluble, and operates in the blue-green region of the spectrum. Saccharide recognition in our probe system is achieved with a boronic acids appended viologen that serves as an analyte responsive fluorescence quencher. We used an anionic dye which forms a weakly fluorescent complex with the cationic viologen receptor. At and near physiological pH, saccharide binding by the receptor results in a partial charge neutralization of the viologen. This produces an increase in the fluorescent signal dependent on glucose concentration. Incorporating the probe into a hydrogel polymer allowed for continuous monitoring of glucose concentrations in the physiological range in vivo. In another application, an array of probes with differential selectivity was used to discriminate important carbohydrate metabolites in water in multiwell plates.

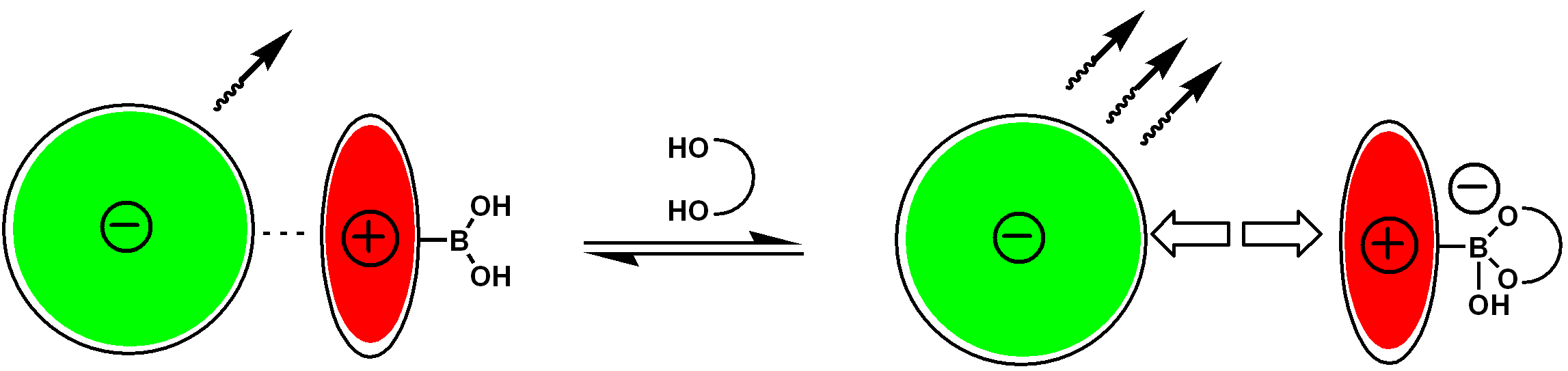
Boronic acid dyes.

=== LAB reagent ===
Lithium aminoborohydride (LAB) reagents are powerful reducing agents, comparable to lithium aluminum hydride (LAH) and Vitride, yet selective in their reducing properties. They are thermally stable and much less water reactive than LAH and Vitride. LAB reagents reduce a wide range of functional groups: aldehydes, ketones, esters, lactones, amides, anhydrides, oximes, nitriles, epoxides and halides. These compounds are readily reduced in one hour or less at ambient temperature. Carboxylic acids are not reduced by LAB reagents. Some LAB reagents are available commercially from Sigma-Aldrich.

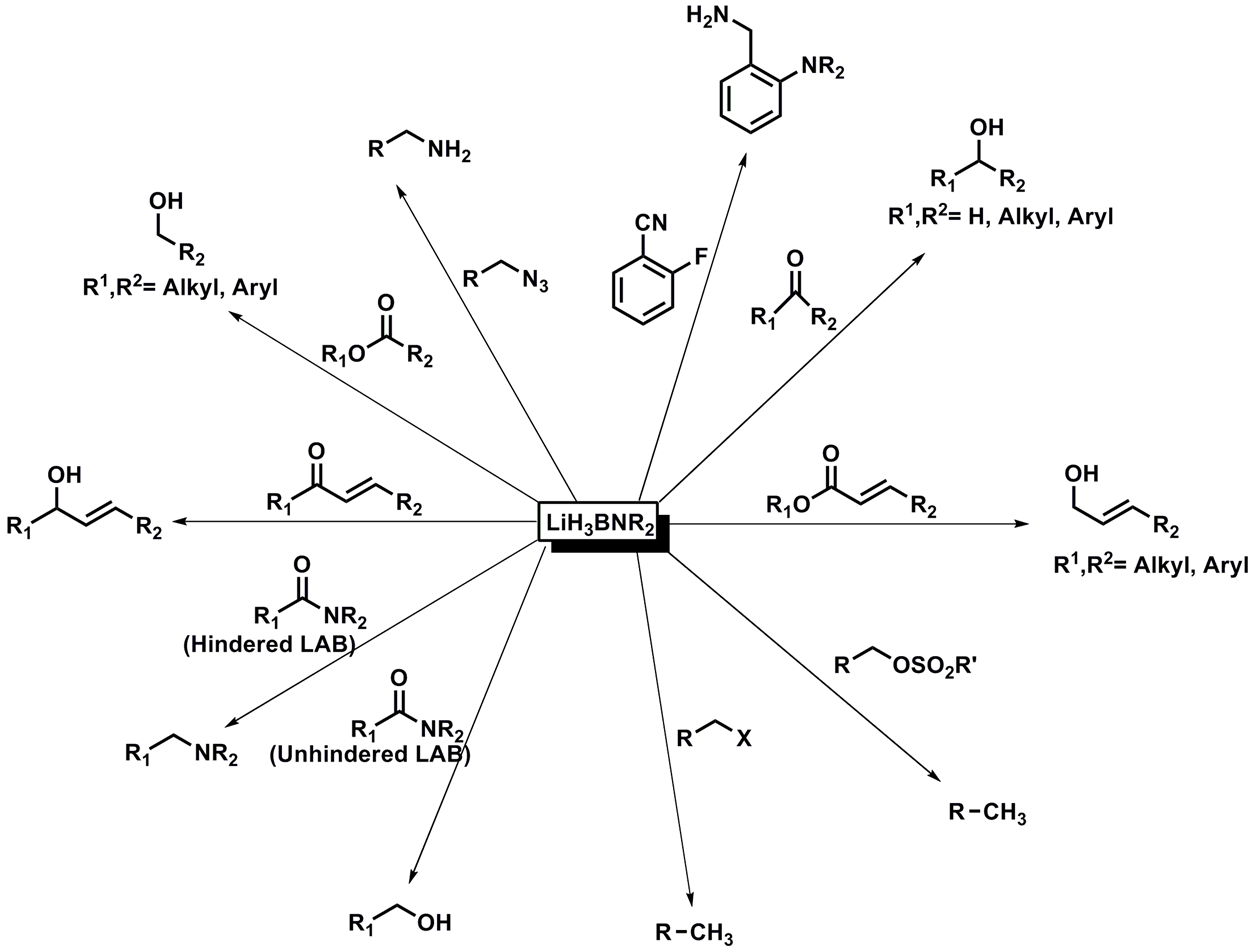
Reactions of LAB.

=== TarB-X reagent ===
In conjunction with their work on the LAB reagent, Singaram's laboratory developed the chiral lewis acid/asymmetric reducing agent TarB-X, also known as "Singaram's reagent". TarB-X is a derivative of tartaric acid and organo-borane compounds. TarBX may used as an inexpensive and efficient way to reduce aromatic alkyl ketones to enantiomerically pure secondary alcohols in conjunction with the use of the mild reducing agent sodium borohydride. TarB-X represents a new type of chiral Lewis acid and the authors note that "because the reagent is easily prepared, induces high enantioselectivity, and can be essentially fully recovered, the implications for its use in both industry and academia appear to be quite promising."

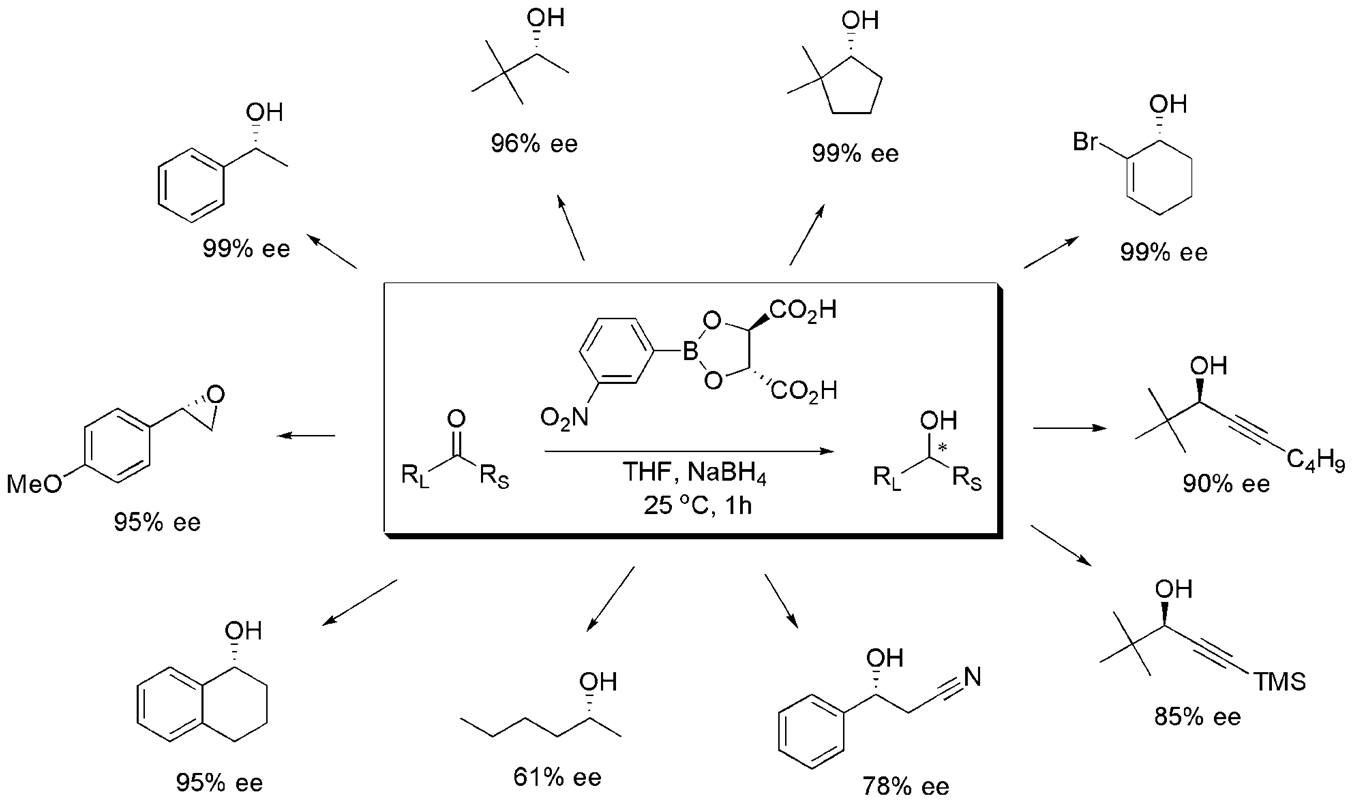
Reactions of TarBX.
