= Harry Haslam (footballer, born 1875) =

English footballer

Personal information
- Full name: Harry Bertie Haslam
- Date of birth: 19 March 1872
- Place of birth: Duffield, England
- Date of death: 19 October 1943 (aged 71)
- Place of death: Derby, England
- Position: Wing half

Senior career*
Years	Team	Apps	(Gls)
1895–1896	Gresley Rovers		
1896–1900	Belper Town		
1900–1902	Derby County	8	(0)
1902	Belper Town		
Total		8	(0)
- * Club domestic league appearances and goals

Harry Bertie Haslam (22 November 1875 – 19 October 1943) was an English footballer who played in the Football League for Derby County. He died at the Derbyshire Royal Infirmary in 1943.
