= Harry Hallam (academic) =

British academic (died 1977)

Harry Evans Hallam
- Died: 1977
- Education: Aberystwyth University
- Employer: Swansea University
- Spouse: Joan
- Children: David
- Scientific career
- Fields: Chemistry
- Workplaces: Swansea University

Harry Evans Hallam (d. 1977) was a chemist and academic at the University College of Swansea.

== Early life and career ==
Hallam spent his early years in East Africa. He attended Ardwyn Grammar School in Aberystwyth before going on to serve in the RAF. He studied chemistry at the University College of Aberystwyth and then undertook a University of London PhD by correspondence while working at the University of Khartoum.

== Academic career ==
In 1955 Hallam was appointed to the staff of the Department of Chemistry at University College of Swansea becoming Senior Lecturer in 1964 and Reader in 1970. In 1963, Hallam took a year's sabbatical and became an adviser in physical chemistry at the new University of Nigeria at Nsukka. He had active international collaborations and was presented with a medal by the University of Helsinki in 1973 for his outstanding service and was also a visiting professor at the University of Marburg in 1975. Hallam was known for his work in infrared spectroscopy of the hydrogen bond and as one of the founders of matrix isolation spectroscopy. He died unexpectedly on 14 May 1977.

== Works ==
- Vibrational spectroscopy of trapped species; infrared and Raman studies of matrix-isolated molecules, radicals and ions. London; New York: J. Wiley (1973 ISBN 978-0-471-34330-1)
- Modern Analytical Methods. London: Chemical Society (1972 ISBN 978-0-85186-759-5)

== Personal life ==
Hallam was married to Joan and they had a son called David. He was an active member of the Clyne Chapel, Blackpill.

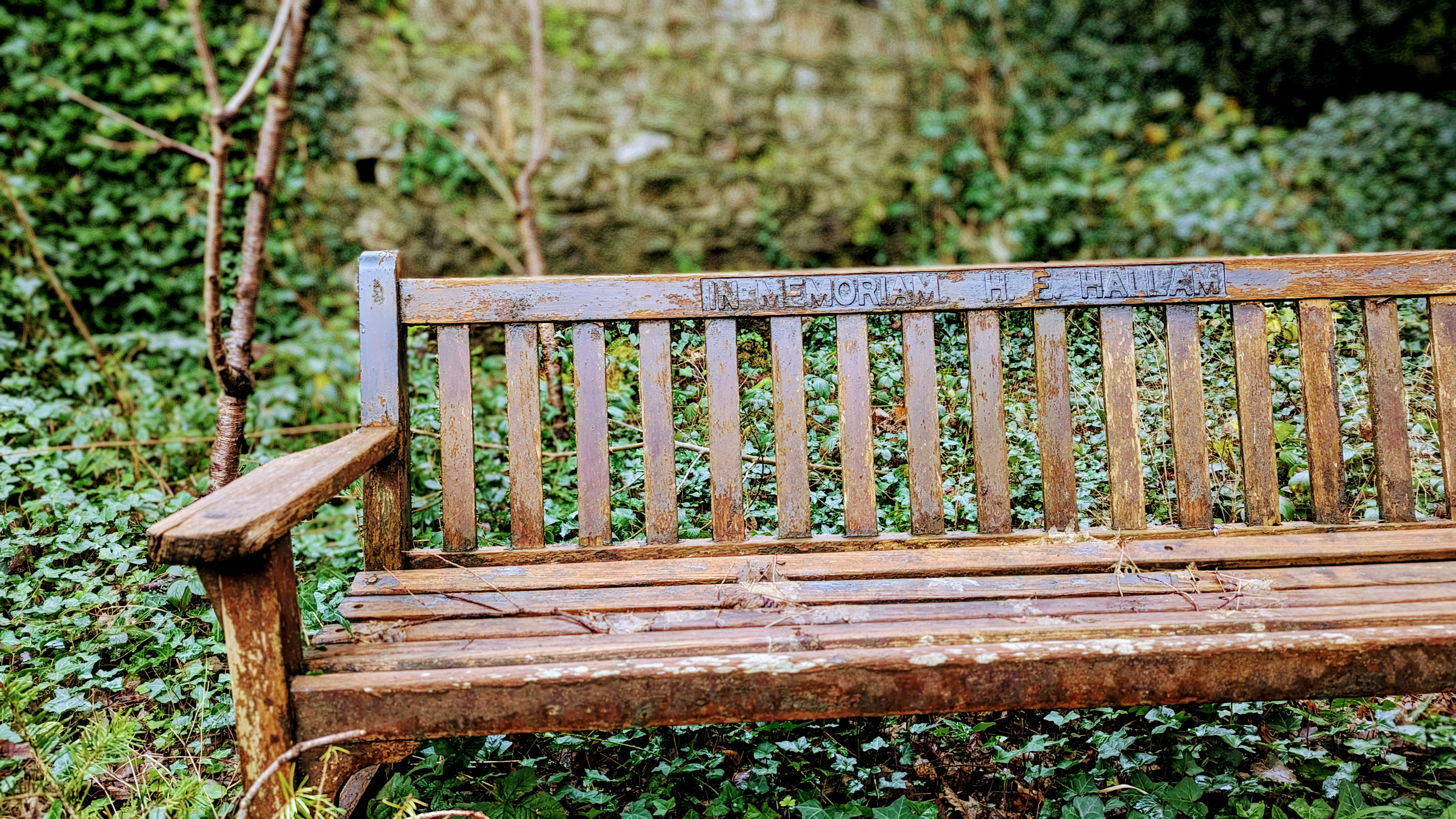
In Memoriam H. E. Hallam, Clyne Chapel

== The Harry Hallam Memorial Fund ==
In his memory, an endowment for an annual lecture to take a "particular account would be taken of Harry’s interest in spectroscopy" was created in 1977 with an appeal made for donations in the Journal of Molecular Structure. The lectureship is administered by the South Wales West Local Section of the Royal Society of Chemistry.

=== Hallam Prizewinners ===
- 1983: M. S. Garley
- 1984: T. A. Sheppard
- 1986: A. M. M. Doherty and P. Graham
- 1988: Miss S. L. Giddings
- 1989: G. Williams
- 1990: Miss T. J. Lovelock
- 1991: Ian A. Evetts
- 1993: A. J. Parry
- 1994: S. R. Andrews and Prof David A. Worsley
- 1995 P. D. J. Anderson
- 1996: Sara Shinton
- 1997: P. Green and R. Phillips
- 1999: M. Francis
- 2000: D. K. Thomas
- 2001 S. Ford
- 2002: Rachel Fretwell and Kay Eaton
- 2003: D. J. Mitchell
- ...
- 2008: Rachel C. Evans

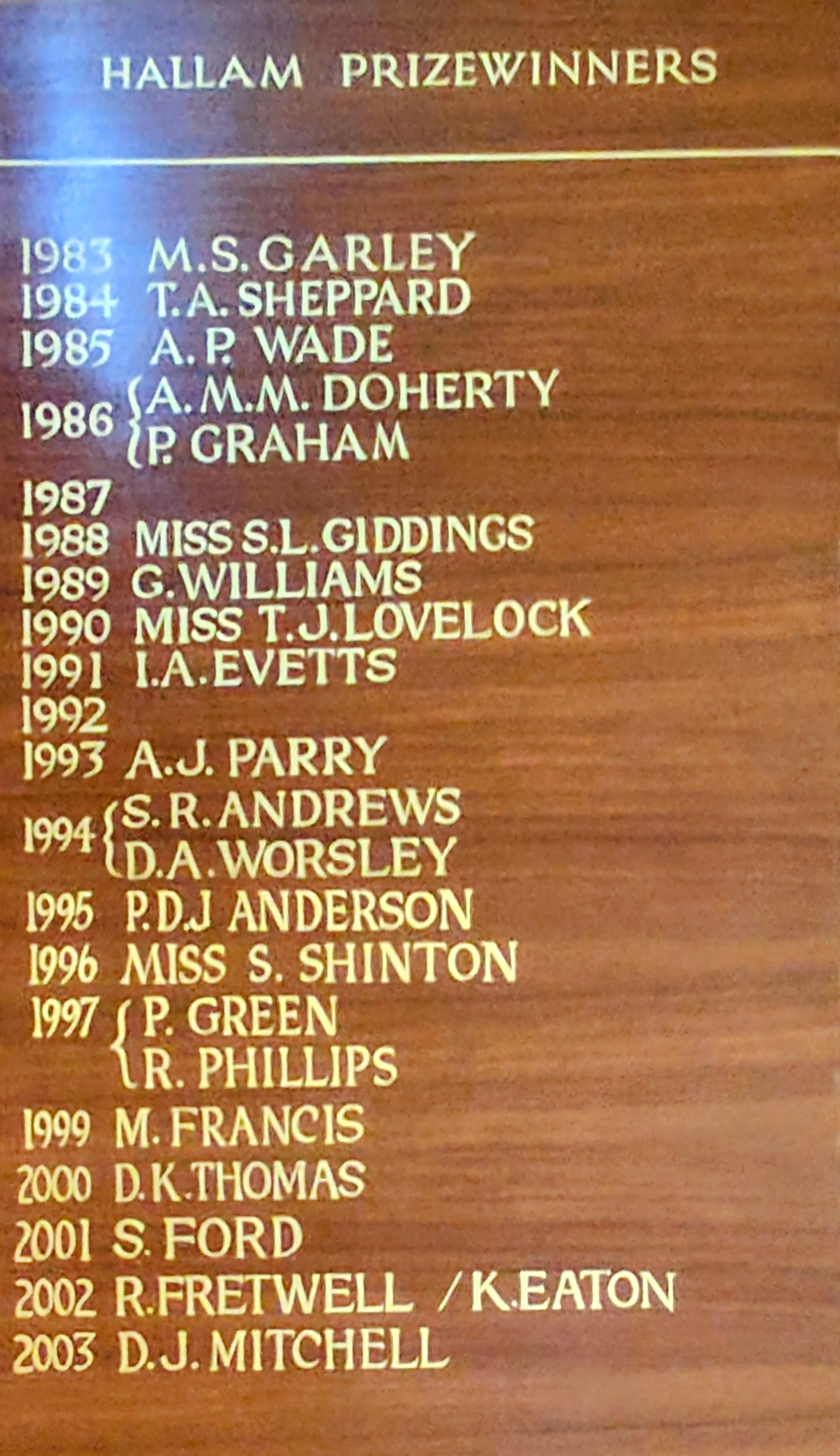
Hallam prizewinners
