= Michael F. Lappert =

British chemist

Michael Lappert FRS
- Born: 31 December 1928; Czechoslovakia
- Died: 28 March 2014 (aged 85); East Sussex, England, U.K.
- Education: Northern Polytechnic
- Scientific career
- Fields: inorganic chemistry
- Thesis: Interaction of boron trichloride with alcohols and ethers (1951)
- Doctoral advisor: William Gerrard
- Doctoral students: E.W. Abel; Philip Power

Michael Franz Lappert FRS (31 December 1928 – 28 March 2014) was a Czech-born British inorganic chemist. Mainly located at the University of Sussex, he was recognized for contributions to organometallic complexes.

== Early life and education ==
Lappert was born in Czechoslovakia and came to the UK as a Kindertransport refugee. He received his PhD in 1951 at the Northern Polytechnic, London.

== Career and research ==
His areas of research often included studies on low coordination numbers and metal amido complexes.

== Awards and honours ==
Lappert was elected as a Fellow of the Royal Society (FRS) in 1979.
