= Keith Smith (chemist) =

British chemist

Professor Emeritus Keith Smith FRSC FLSW
- Born: 15 January 1947 (age 79); Walsall
- Education: Manchester University
- Awards

Swansea University Head of Chemistry Department
- In office 1990–1993
- Preceded by: Andrew Pelter
- Succeeded by: Dai Games
- In office 2001–2017
- Preceded by: Dai Games
- Succeeded by: Owen Guy
- Scientific career
- Fields: Boron chemistry
- Workplaces: Swansea University, Cardiff University
- Thesis: (1971)
- Academic advisors: Andrew Pelter

Keith Smith FRSC FLSW (born 15 January 1947) is an academic and British organic chemist.

== Life ==
Smith was born on 15 January 1947 in Walsall, England but grew up in Brown Edge, North Staffordshire. He attended the Leek High School, before gaining a scholarship to study Chemistry at Manchester University where he went on to achieve a BSc with First Class Honors in 1968. Smith received an MSc in 1969 and a PhD in 1971 in the field of boron chemistry working under the supervision of Dr Andrew Pelter. In August 1968, Smith married Lynn who he met during his time at high school.

== Career ==
Smith received a Royal Society European Exchange Fellowship to take up a postdoctoral research position with Professor Albert Eschenmoser at the ETH in Zürich, Switzerland. In 1971, he became a lecturer at University College of Swansea where his old supervisor Professor Andrew Pelter had recently taken up his Chair of Organic Chemistry. Smith spent a sabbatical year (1978–79) collaborating with H C Brown at Purdue University, USA. Smith quickly gained promotion becoming Professor at Swansea in 1988, and also became Head of the Department of Chemistry in 1990–93 and again in 2001–2007. Smith was vocal in criticising the decision by Swansea University's council to phase out undergraduate chemistry teaching at the institution, a decision that was reversed in 2017. In 2007, Smith moved to Cardiff University as Professor of Organic Chemistry until his formal retirement in 2013.
