= Ronald A. Hites =

American environmental chemist

- Born: September 19, 1942; Jackson, Michigan, US
- Died: January 5, 2024 (aged 81); Bloomington, Indiana, US
- Education: Oakland University (BS); Massachusetts Institute of Technology (PhD)
- Known for: Environmental mass spectrometry
- Scientific career
- Fields: Environmental chemistry
- Workplaces: Massachusetts Institute of Technology; Indiana University Bloomington
- Thesis: Computer recording and processing of mass spectra (1968)
- Doctoral advisor: Klaus Biemann
- Doctoral students: Staci Simonich
- Other notable students: Post-docs: Philip Gschwend; Milton L. Lee; Deborah Swackhamer
- Website: Hites Laboratory at the Wayback Machine (archived 2023-05-10)

Ronald A. Hites (September 19, 1942 – January 5, 2024) was an American environmental chemist and a Distinguished Professor Emeritus at Indiana University Bloomington who had contributed to 500 scientific papers which generated 27,000 citations and has earned him the title "founding father of environmental mass spectrometry."

== Early life and education ==
Hites was born in Jackson, Michigan on September 19, 1942. He earned his B.A. degree in chemistry from Oakland University in Michigan in 1964 and then went to the Massachusetts Institute of Technology where he earned his Ph. D. in 1968 in organic analytical chemistry while under the supervision of Klaus Biemann. He was on a postdoctoral fellowship at the U.S. Department of Agriculture and then returned to MIT as a staff researcher in 1969.

== Career ==
Hites was appointed Assistant Professor at MIT in 1972 and was later promoted to associate professor in 1976. Hites left MIT for Indiana in 1979 where he was given a joint professorial appointment in the Department of Chemistry and in the School of Public and Environmental Affairs.

He is a Fellow of the American Chemical Society and the American Association for the Advancement of Science and also founded the Journal of the American Society for Mass Spectrometry.

Ronald Hites was a Distinguished Professor Emeritus; Director, Hites Laboratory. his expertise included applying organic analytical chemistry techniques to the analysis of trace levels of toxic pollutants, especially polybrominated flame retardants and polychlorinated biphenyls and pesticides.

Distinguished Professor Emeritus Ronald Hites was an environmental chemist specializing in the behavior of potentially toxic organic compounds. He had been with O'Neill since 1979, following 15 years at the Massachusetts Institute of Technology, where he received his doctorate in analytical chemistry.

Prof. Hites published six books, nearly 500 scientific papers, and supervised about 90 post-doctoral associates and graduate students.

Recent work involved the use of mass spectrometry to analyze trace levels of potentially toxic chemicals in the Great Lakes basin, including discontinued and alternative flame retardants, polychlorinated biphenyls, organochlorine pesticides, and polycyclic aromatic hydrocarbons. He also studied the atmospheric transport of these chemicals throughout the environment.

Prof. Hites was a Fellow of the American Chemical Society, the Society of Environmental Toxicology and Chemistry, and the American Association for the Advancement of Science.

He received the 2016 Lifetime Achievement Award from the International Association for Great Lakes Research, the 1993 Founders Award from the Society of Environmental Toxicology and Chemistry and the 1991 Award for Creative Advances in Environmental Science and Technology from the American Chemical Society.

Between 1990-2018, he was an associate editor of Environmental Science and Technology.

In 1988, Hites spearheaded the creation of the Journal of the American Society for Mass Spectrometry while serving as president of that society. The Ron Hites Award is now given annually the best paper in that journal.

== Honors and awards ==
- Award for Creative Advances in Environmental Science from the American Chemical Society,

1991

- Founders Award from the Society of Environmental Toxicology and Chemistry, 1993
- American Association for the Advancement of Science Fellow, 1996-present
- American Chemical Society Charter Fellow, 2009-present
- Lifetime Achievement Award, International Association for Great Lakes Research, 2016
- Bicentennial Medal, Indiana University, 2020

== Personal life ==
Ronald Hites died on January 5, 2024, at his home in Bloomington, Indiana.
