= Swackhamer =

Swackhamer or Swackhammer is a surname. Notable people with the surname include:

- Deborah Swackhamer (1954–2021), American environmental scientist
- E. W. Swackhamer (1927–1994), American television and film director
- William D. Swackhamer (1915–2008), American politician

== Fictional characters ==
- Mr. Swackhammer, a main alien character in the 1996 animated film Space Jam
