= Barry Hart =

Barry Hart may refer to:

- Barry Hart, ring name of American professional wrestler Barry Horowitz (born 1960)
- Barry Hart (academic) (born 1940), Australian environmental scientist and academic
