= Víctor Díaz =

Víctor Díaz may refer to:

- Victor Hugo Díaz (1927–1977), tango, folklore and jazz harmonicist
- Victor Diaz Lamich (born 1966), Chilean photojournalist
- Víctor Díaz (basketball) (born 1968), basketball player from Venezuela
- Víctor Díaz (baseball) (born 1981), Dominican baseball outfielder
- Víctor Díaz (footballer, born 1988), Spanish footballer
- Víctor Díaz (footballer, born 1991), Spanish footballer
