= Deborah Swackhamer =

Environmental chemist (1954–2021)

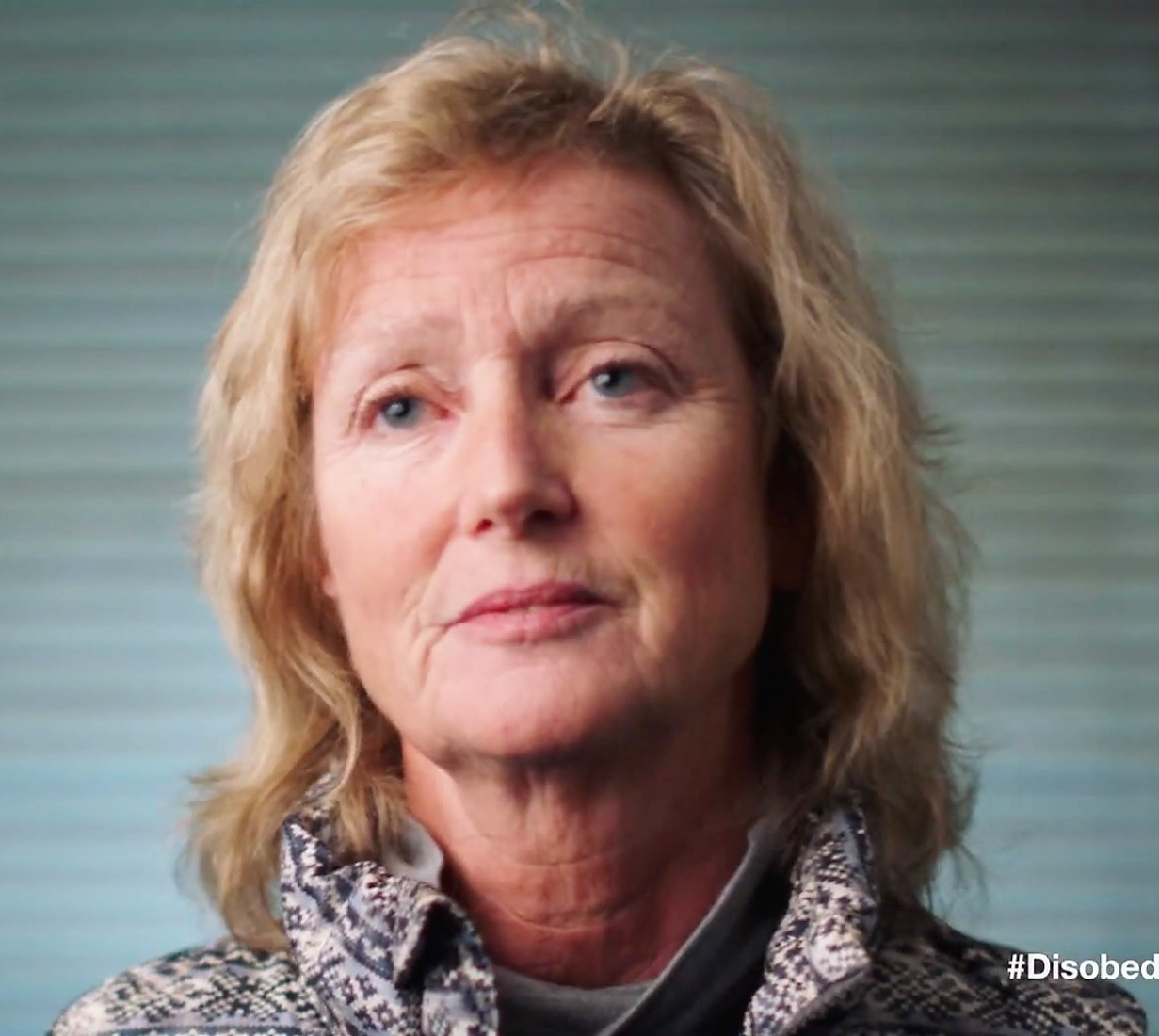
- Swackhamer as a finalist for the MIT Disobedience Award in 2019
- Born: June 23, 1954; Raritan, New Jersey
- Died: April 23, 2021 (aged 66); Minneapolis, Minnesota
- Education: Grinnell College, AB in Chemistry, 1976; University of Wisconsin, Madison, MS in Water Chemistry, 1981; University of Wisconsin, Madison, PhD in Oceanography and Limnology, 1985
- Awards: Fellow, Royal Society of Chemistry
- Scientific career
- Fields: Environmental Chemistry, Oceanography and Limnology
- Workplaces: Indiana University; University of Minnesota
- Thesis: Role of water-particle partitioning and sedimentation in controlling the fate and transport of PCBs in lakes (1985)
- Doctoral advisor: David E. Armstrong

Deborah Liebl Swackhamer (June 23, 1954 – April 23, 2021) was an environmental chemist and professor emerita at the University of Minnesota in Minneapolis. Swackhamer applied her expertise in studying the effects of exposure to toxic chemicals, as well as the processes that spread those chemicals, to developing policies that address exposure risks.

== Education and early career ==
Swackhamer received her bachelor's degree in chemistry from Grinnell College in Iowa in 1976. In addition to excelling in Chemistry during her time at Grinnell, she was a consummate athlete and singer. Making music was a passion throughout her undergraduate years. Swackhamer received her Master of Science from University of Wisconsin–Madison in 1981, where she studied Water Chemistry. In 1985, she earned her PhD in Oceanography and Limnology from the University of Wisconsin–Madison with a thesis entitled "Role of water-particle partitioning and sedimentation in controlling the fate and transport of PCBs in lakes" in the laboratory of David E. Armstrong. PCB, or polychlorinated biphenyl, is a chlorine compound that was once widely found in dielectric and coolant fluids used in electronics. PCBs are now widely considered an environmental contaminant as they've been shown to cause a variety of adverse health effects, including cancer, fertility complications, and neurologic disorders. Swackhamer's thesis research focused on better understanding how PCBs were transported in bodies of water, using Lake Michigan as a model for her work.

Following her doctorate, Swackhamer became a postdoctoral research associate at Indiana University in Chemistry and Public & Environmental Affairs, working in Ronald A. Hites's group from 1985 to 1987. There, she worked to develop a method for quantitating the insecticide toxaphene in environmental samples using mass spectrometry. The pesticide was most commonly used on cotton and in livestock and poultry until its use was cancelled in 1990, as it is a known carcinogen. She also characterized how organochlorine, another pesticide, accumulated and was transported through lake trout and lake whitefish in Siskiwit Lake, a remote lake on Isle Royale in Lake Superior.

== Research ==
In 1987, Swackhamer joined the University of Minnesota faculty where she continued her research of studying the process that affect the behavior and fate of organic contaminants that are resistant to degradation and remain in the environment for a long time, known as "persistent organic compounds." Her research more specifically centered on PCBs, dioxins, and pesticides in the Great Lakes region. For instance, her group found that the high water concentrations of the pesticide toxaphene in Lake Superior are the result of colder temperatures and lower sedimentation rates. Toxaphene was absorbed by the Great Lakes as a gas, and while its use was discontinued in 1990, it persists in varying concentrations across the Lakes. Her group also modeled annual and seasonal fluxes of toxaphene from water to air and sediment, finding that toxaphene contamination will persist far into the future in the Great Lakes region.

Swackhamer also studied the impact of these environmental contaminants on animals in lake populations. She was part of research efforts that uncovered reproductive complications in male fathead minnows exposed to wastewater treatment byproducts. Her group worked to develop methods to measure and assess the effects of suspended solids and chemical stressors in lakes on plankton populations and Daphnia, aquatic crustaceans also known as "water fleas". Swackhamer's team also worked to model the effects of microbes in spreading contamination across the food web. These microbes take up organic contaminants and transfer them to the protozoan grazers, and so the contaminants travel up the food chain.

Her research was supported by agencies like the United States Environmental Protection Agency (EPA), the National Oceanic and Atmospheric Administration, the National Science Foundation.

== Public service and leadership ==
Swackhamer lent her expertise to serving on a number of environmental advisory boards. Starting in 2000 to 2013, she joined the Science Advisory Board of the International Joint Commission of the United States and Canada, which provides scientific advice to the Commission and the Water Quality Board under the Great Lakes Water Quality Agreement. During her tenure, she co-authored a report on emerging issues of the Great Lakes to identify issues of importance for the next 25 years, as well as opportunities for sustaining progress under the Great Lakes Quality Agreement. The challenges identified included climate change, chemical contaminants, and changes to the biological community surrounding the Great Lakes. In 2003, Swackhamer became the director of the University of Minnesota's Water Resources Center. From 2006 to 2012, she was a member of the board of directors, National Institutes of Water Resources (NIWR), serving as its president from 2010 to 2011. In 2015, Swackhamer was appointed to the National Academy of Sciences Board of Environmental Science and Toxicology.

From 2003 to 2012, Swackhamer was a member of the United States Environmental Protection Agency's Advisory Board, and served as its Chair from 2008 to 2012. She later served as chair of the EPA's Board of Scientific Counselors (BOSC), an independent and external panel of experts that advises the agency's office of science. Her three-year term began in the spring of 2015; however, she was prematurely dismissed from her position following her testimony to the United States House Committee on Science, Space, and Technology in June 2017. The Committee's minority leadership invited Swackhamer to testify on state involvement in EPA regulation setting. In her testimony, she stressed the need for the role of bipartisan support for environmental protections, the capacity to produce robust scientific research at the state level, and the importance of environmental regulations for public health. During her testimony, which ran counter to the Trump-era EPA's overall position of decreasing environmental regulations, she emphasized that she was delivering her opinions as a private citizen and scientific expert—not in her capacity as the head of an EPA advisory. Nevertheless, EPA leadership tried to interfere with her testimony in advance of the hearing, which raised concerns among the House Democrats, who alleged that such interference was "inappropriate and may have violated federal regulations." Despite the pressure, Swackhamer did not change her testimony and was subsequently dismissed. Following her dismissal, she told The New York Times: "The Board of Scientific Counselors had 68 members two months ago [in April 2018]. It will have 11 come Sept. 1. They’ve essentially suspended scientific activities by ending these terms.”

== Awards and honors ==
- Fellow, Royal Society of Chemistry, 2007
- Society of Environmental Toxicology and Chemistry (SETAC) Founders Award, 2009
- Ada Comstock Scholar Award, University of Minnesota, 2010
- Lifetime Achievement in Water Resources Research and Education, Universities Council on Water Resources, 2017
