= Victor Diaz Lamich =

Canadian photographer

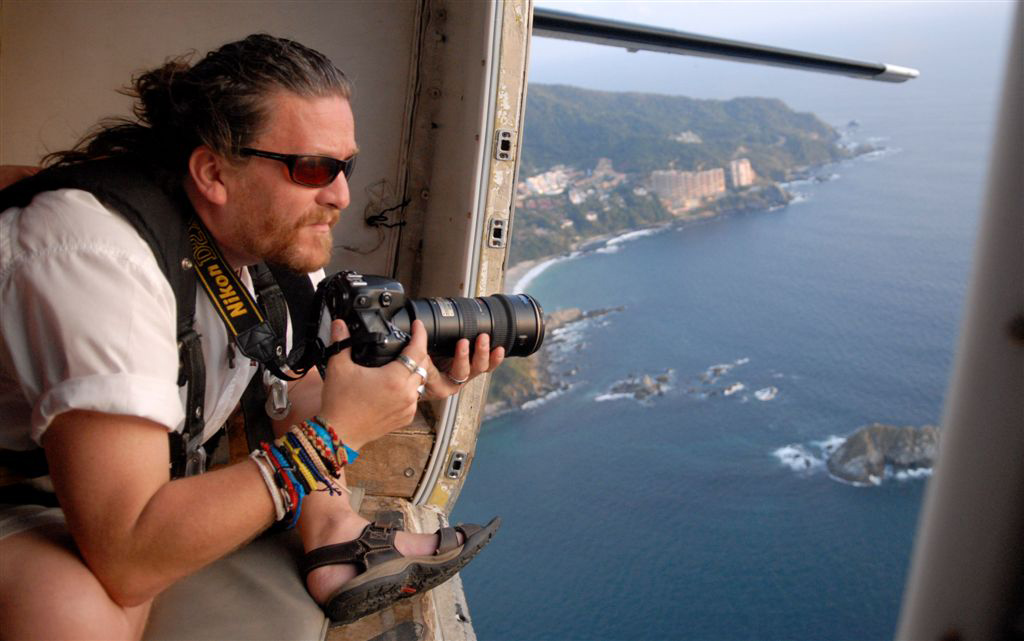
Diaz Lamich working on a plane above La Isla Ixtapa, Zihuatanejo, Mexico

Victor Diaz Lamich (born 1966) is a Canadian photojournalist, first known for his work with The Canadian Press. He is now living in Quebec, Canada.

== Biography ==
Born in 1966, in the agricultural region of Buin, Chile, Victor Diaz Lamich had a peaceful childhood, which was brutally interrupted by the 1973 Chilean coup d'état by dictator Pinochet against the democratically elected president Salvador Allende. His family then moved to Quebec, Canada.

He travelled across Canada, but it is the rediscovery of his native land, "this new Chile post-dictatorship" where he made his way back to his origins and culture. Thereafter, his existence is made up of travel. His work in environmental chemistry makes him travel around South America, devoting all his energies to major environmental issues. Everywhere a camera in hand, soon photography became his sole passion.

== Work ==
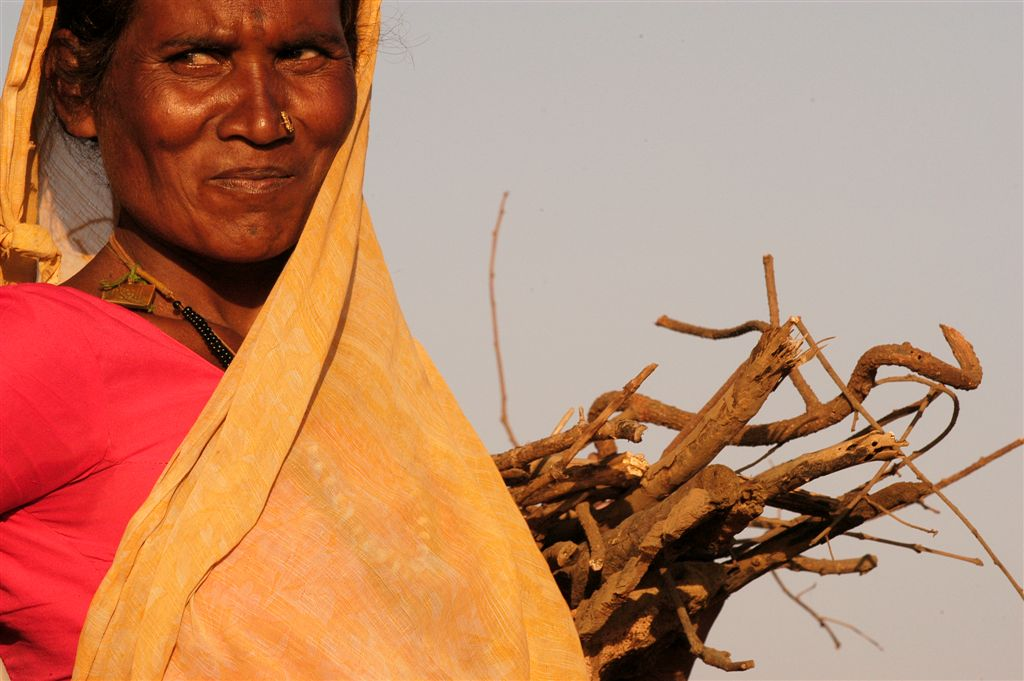
Inde, sur la route des Jeunes musiciens du monde

Diaz Lamich's career takes off as a photojournalist at the very respected cultural magazine Voir Montreal. The Canadian Press and the National Film Board of Canada (NFB) also counted him among their photojournalists. But it is in 2002, when he finally landed the prestigious title as the official photographer for the Festival International de Jazz de Montréal, Les FrancoFolies de Montréal and Montréal Highlights Festival at l'Équipe Spectra.

Diaz Lamich then published his first photo book in October 2005, in collaboration journalist Karina Marceau : « Inde, sur la route des Jeunes musiciens du monde » (English : India, on the road of the young musicians of the world), a photo book following the story of young artists, helping to build music schools for neophytes musicians in third World countries. This publication will be the most important financing tool for the non-profit organization Jeunes musiciens du monde. All the profits were donated to the organization.

In 2007, his second book with the same publisher in November 2007 entitled "Past Perfect" tells Québec city's wonderful history through the Auberge Saint-Antoine history. (Rated today's best Hotel in Canada By Condé Nast Magazine). In 2008, he participates to the "Jazz Festival 30th Anniversary" edition souvenir book. In 2010, "Le Moulin à Paroles Sous Haute Surveillance" souvenir book was published and represents his last published work. In October 2010, he is chosen to be the official photographer of Under-Secretary-General UN Women, Ms. Michelle Bachelet on her visit to Canada. In December 2010 he is also chosen to accompany Ms. Ingrid Betancourt on her visit to Canada.

For the last six years, Diaz Lamich has been working on a series of publications with publisher Sylvain Harvey. These publications will mainly cover themes such as the best places to visit in Mexico as well as a book on the Dominican Republic.

== Current work ==
In 2007, Diaz Lamich published a second book: « Un Passé Plus que Parfait » about the history of Quebec City through the Auberge Saint-Antoine, now sacred best hotel in Canada. Currently, he is working on a series of photo books on various topics in Mexico and the Dominican Republic which will be released for fall 2008.

== Publications ==
- Diaz Lamich, Victor; Marceau, Karina (2005). Inde, sur la route des Jeunes musiciens du monde (in French). color illustrated. Sylvain Harvey Editions. pp. 102 pages. ISBN 978-2-9809056-0-5. OCLC 77052422.
- Diaz Lamich, Victor; Lapointe, Camille (2007). Past perfect. color illustrated. Sylvain Harvey Editions. ISBN 978-2-921703-80-2. OCLC 173248692.
- Diaz Lamich, Victor; Lapointe, Camille (2007). Un passé plus-que-parfait (in French). color illustrated. Sylvain Harvey Editions. ISBN 978-2-921703-79-6. OCLC 173248686.

== Exhibitions ==
- Exhibition Inde, sur la route des Jeunes musiciens du Monde (2005) : Mumbai, Goa, Dharwad, Hubli, Kalkeri.
- Exhibition Pour le droit de vivre en Paix (2006), Festival Victor Jara of Montreal.
- Exhibition Contrastes d'Atacama (2008) at the Festival Montréal en Lumière.

== Work and projects ==
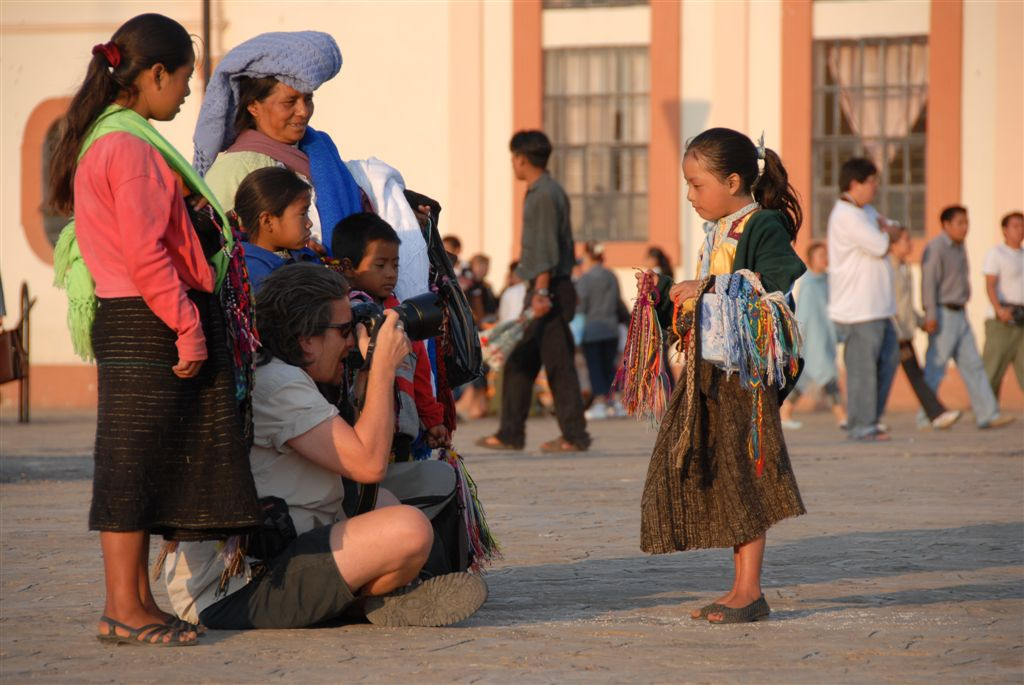
Victor Diaz Lamich working at San Cristóbal de las Casas au Chiapas for Les plus belles villes coloniales du Mexique

- Official Photographer for Mr. Ingrid Betancourt on her visit to Montreal to receive the Woman's Courage Award given buy Reporters without Borders in 2010
- Official photographer for the UN Women Director Ms. Michelle Bachelet on her visit to Canada
- Photographer at The Canadian Press.
- Official photographer at the National Film Board of Canada (NFB)
- Official photographer at the Festival International de Jazz de Montréal.
- Official photographer at the Les FrancoFolies de Montréal.
- Official photographer at the Festival Montréal en lumière.
- Album cover for the French singer Matthieu Chedid (M), under EMI label.
- Album cover for the quebecor singer Thomas Hellman, under Justin Time label.
- Album cover for the quebecor singer Pierre Lapointe (Noël sans pluie).
- DVD cover for the quebecor humorist Louis-José Houde.
- Promotional poster for Québécois singer Ariane Moffatt, under Audiogram label.
- Several photo sessions with international artists : Sophia Loren, Laetitia Casta, Konstantinos Costa-Gavras, Margaret Atwood, Billy Bob Thornton, Ray Charles, Henri Salvador, Erik Mongrain, Ibrahim Ferrer, Carolina Herrera, Paul Anka, Corneille, Lara Fabian etc.
- Several photo sessions for castings with quebecors actors.
- Official photographer at the magazine Voir in Montreal
- Official photographer at the Grand prix de guitare de Montréal.
- Official photographer at the Grandes Mascarades de Montréal.
- Photo book Inde, sur la route des jeunes musiciens du monde.
- Photo book Un Passé Plus que Parfait
- Photo book on Dominican Republic, Sylvain Harvey editions.
- Serie of five books on Mexico, Sylvain Harvey editions.

== Gallery ==
=== Artists ===
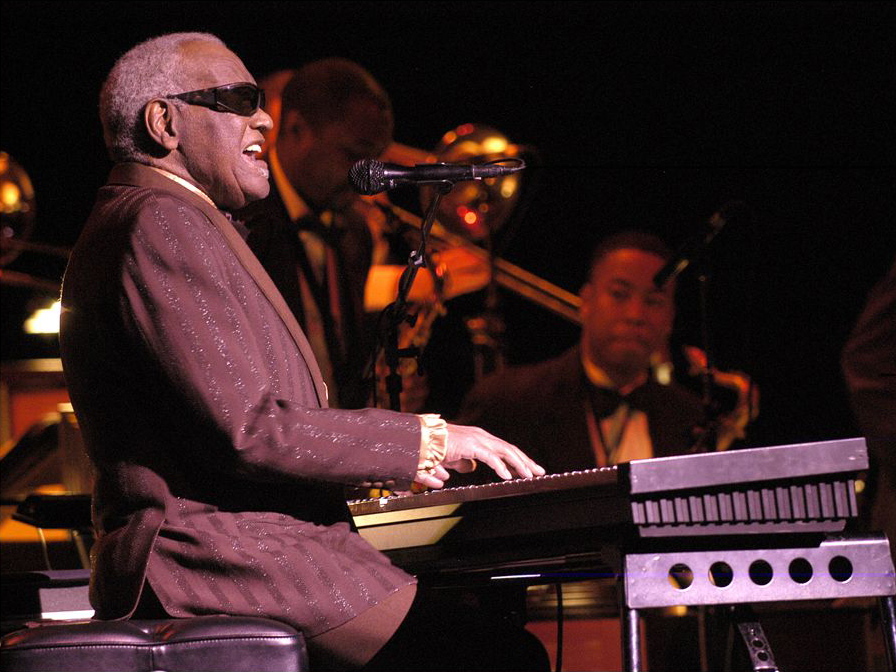
Ray Charles

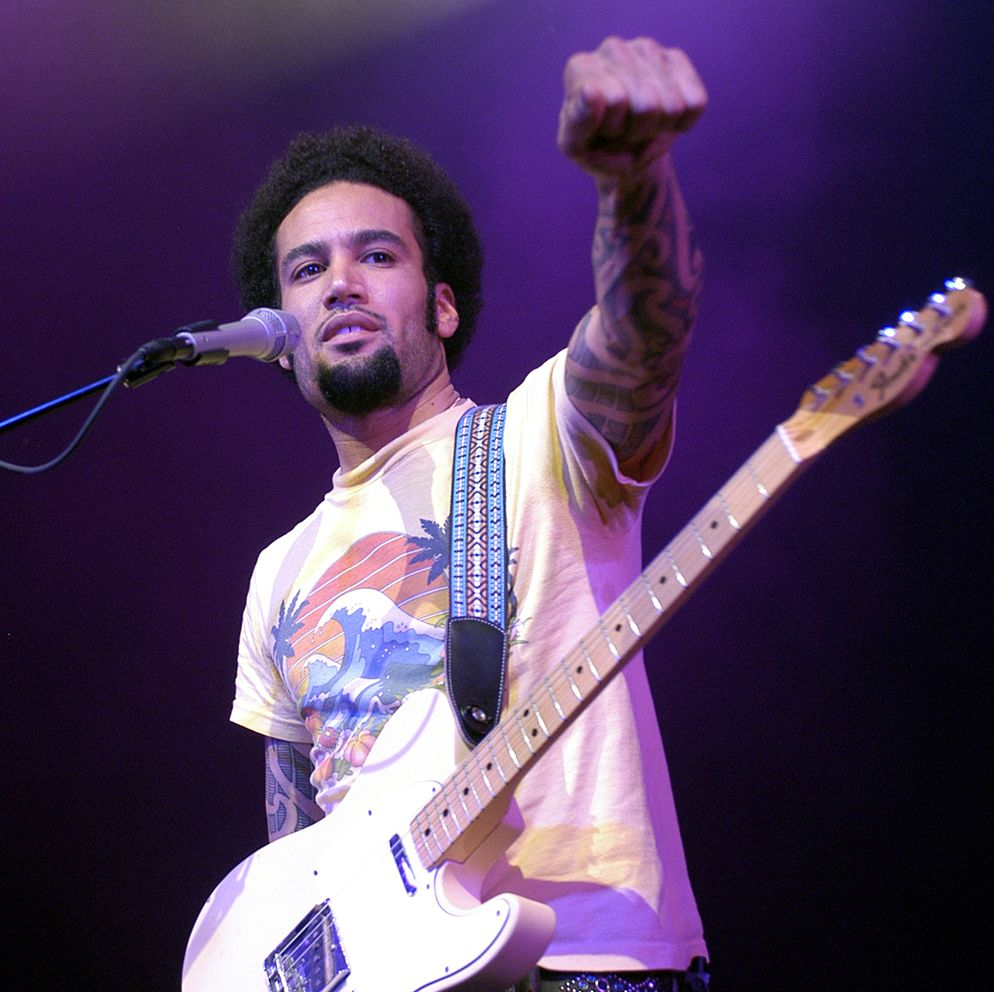
Ben Harper

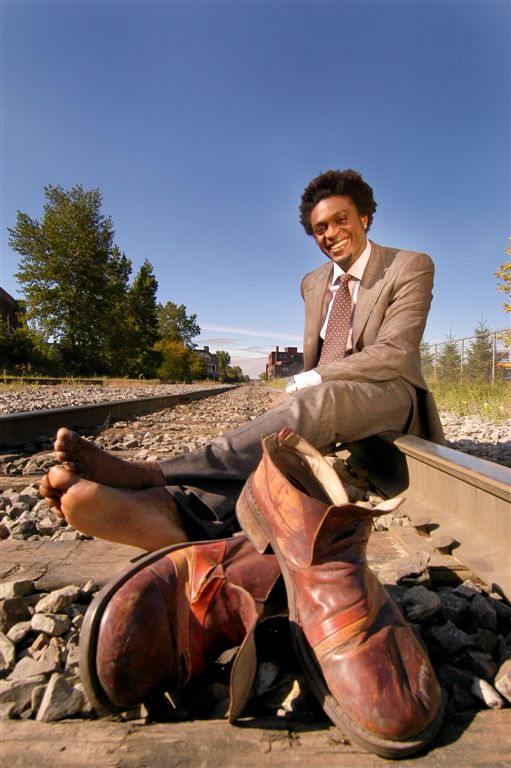
Corneille

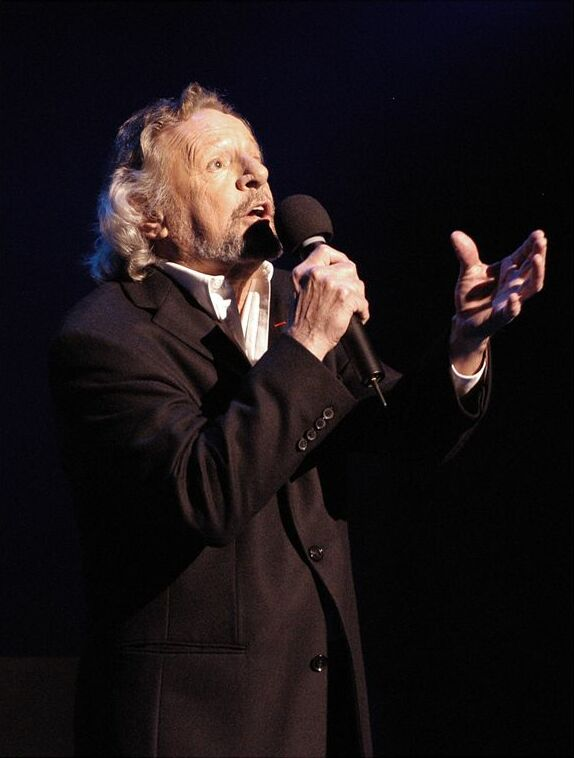
Claude Léveillée

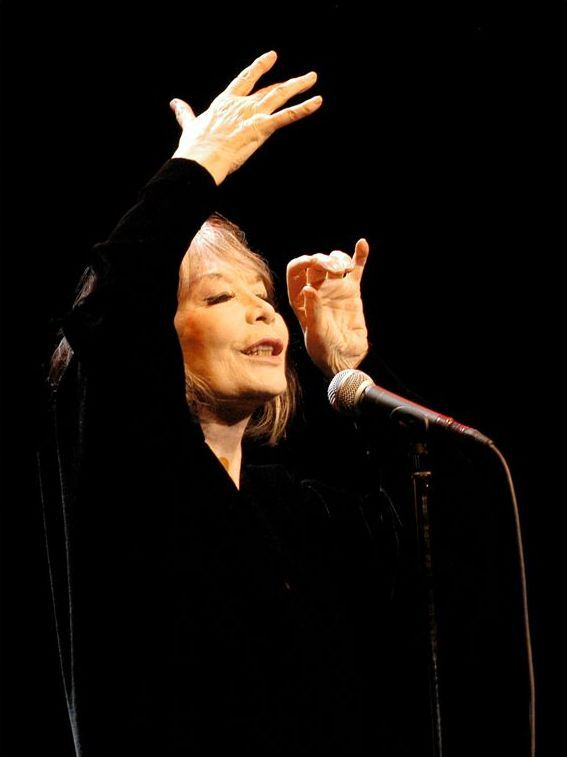
Juliette Gréco

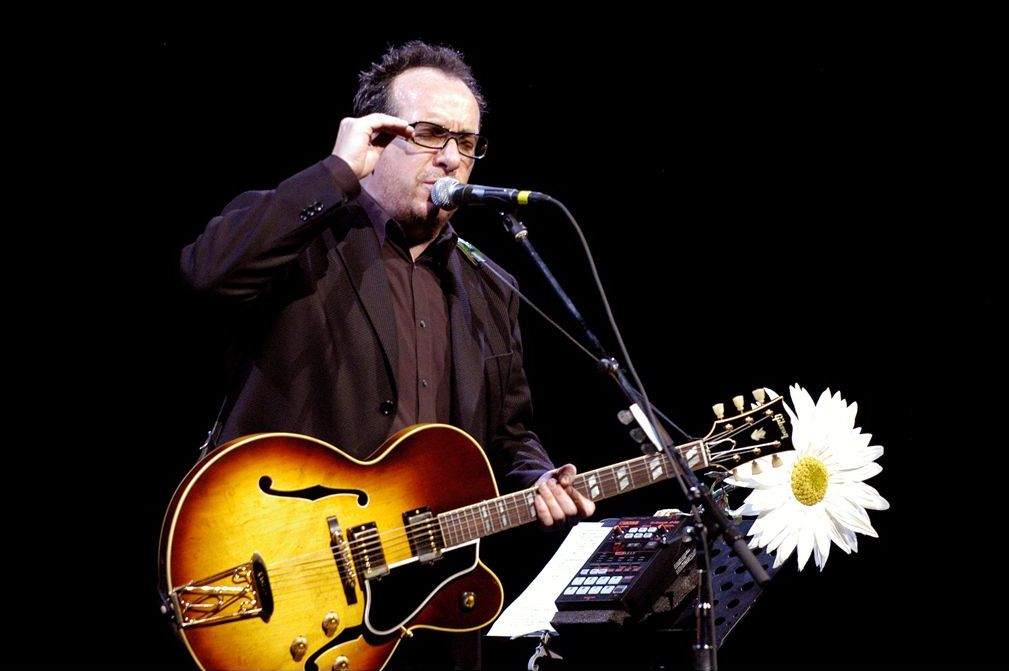
Elvis Costello

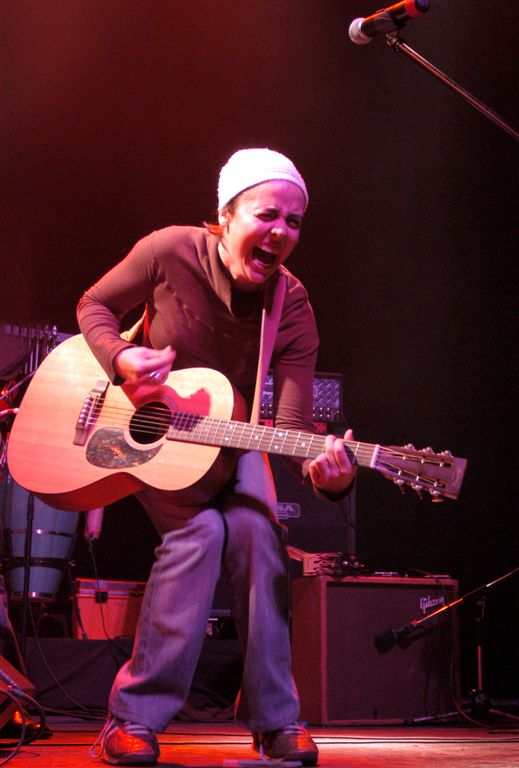
Ariane Moffatt

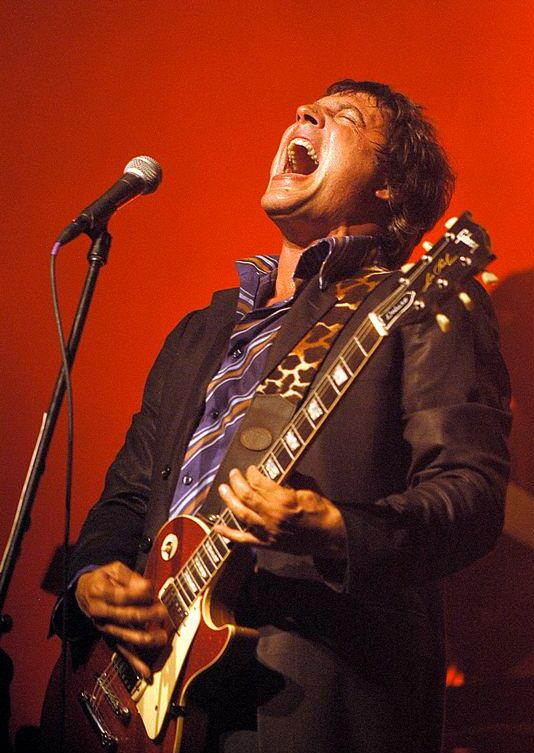
Jean Leloup

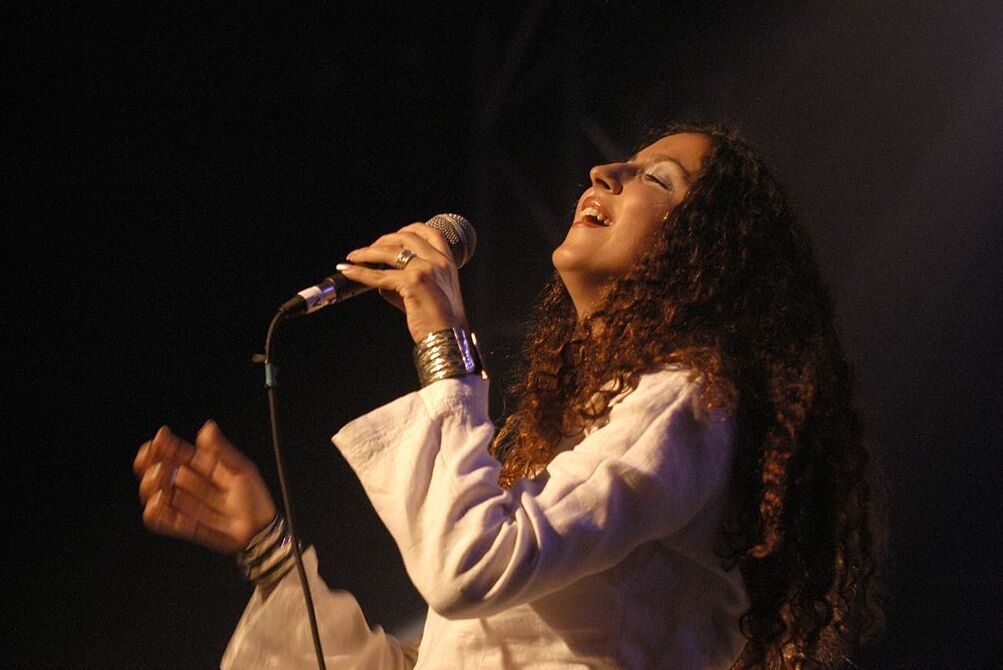
Lynda Thalie

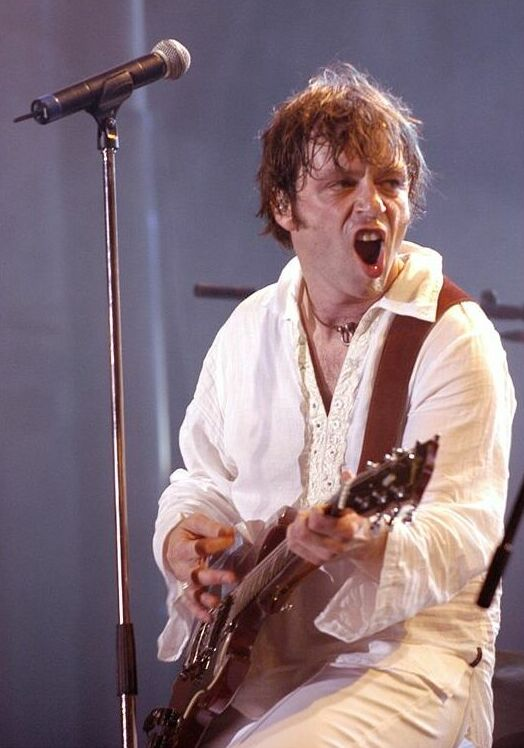
Daniel Boucher

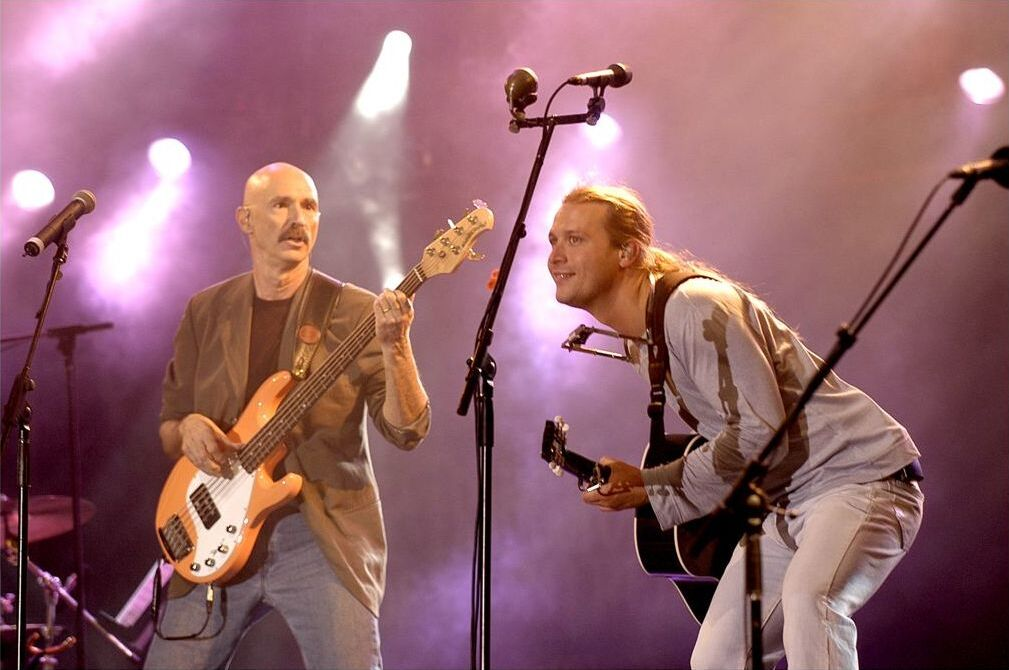
Tony Levin et Kevin Parent

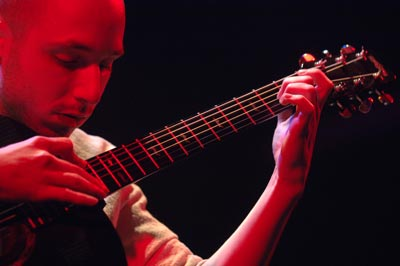
Erik Mongrain

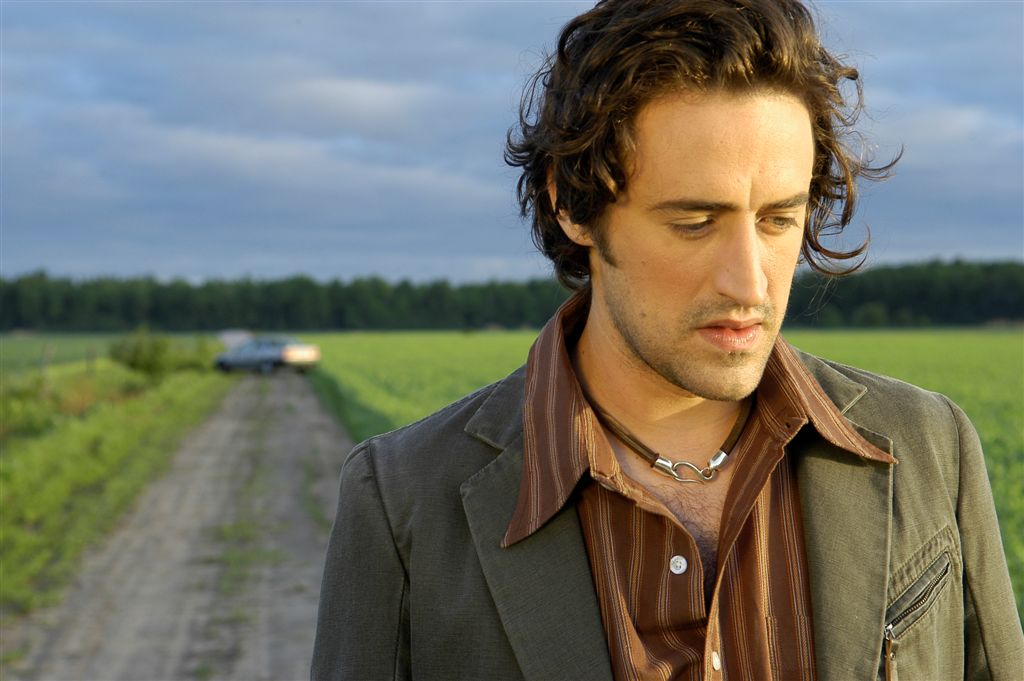
Sébastien Lacombe

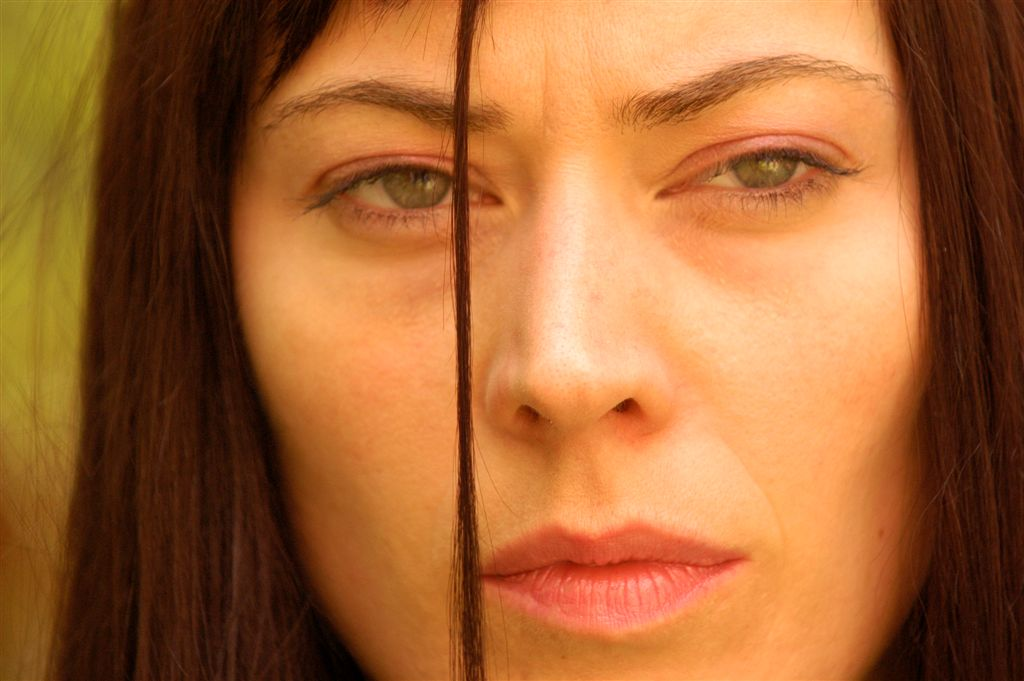
Elizabeth Diaga

=== Landscapes and portraits ===
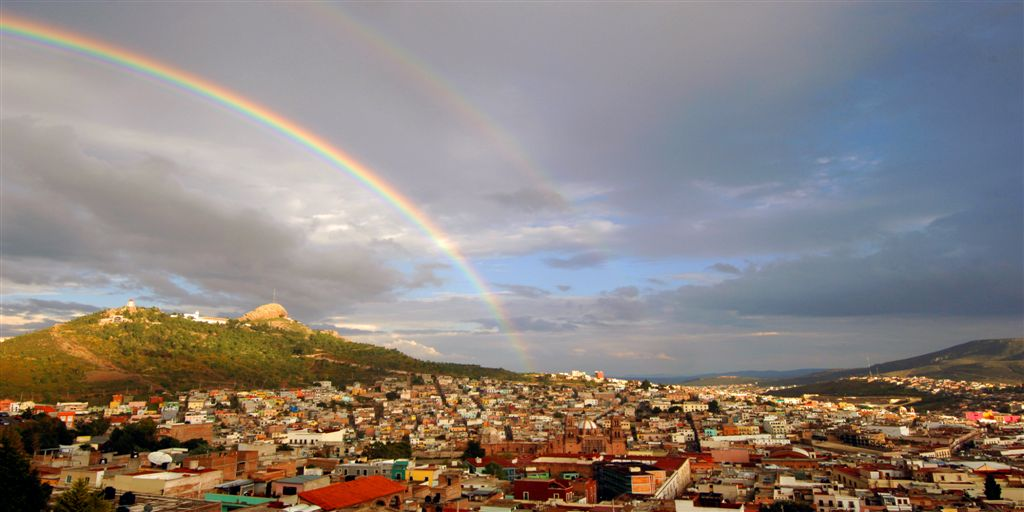
Book « Les plus belles villes coloniales du Mexique »

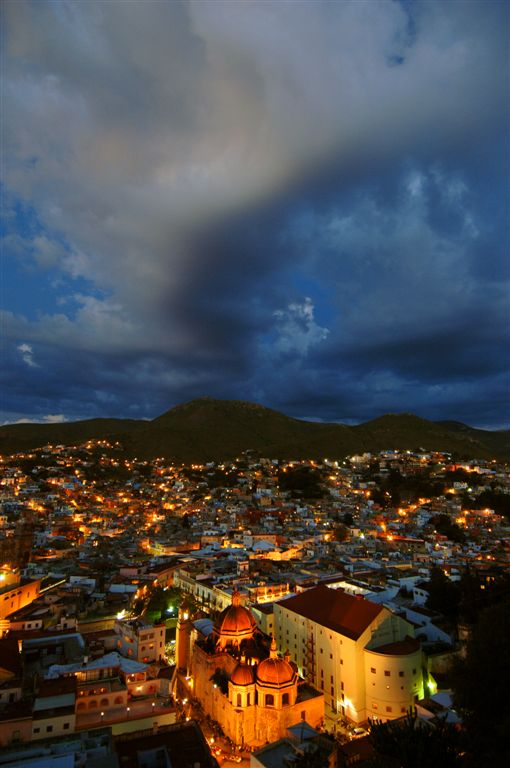
Book « Les plus belles villes coloniales du Mexique »

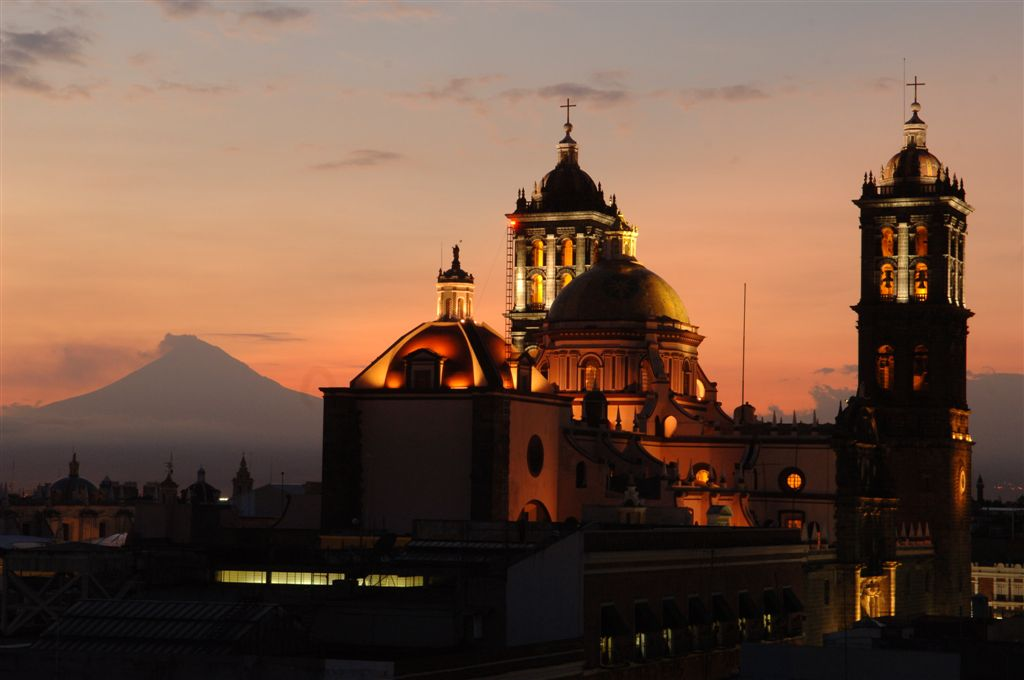
Book « Les plus belles villes coloniales du Mexique »

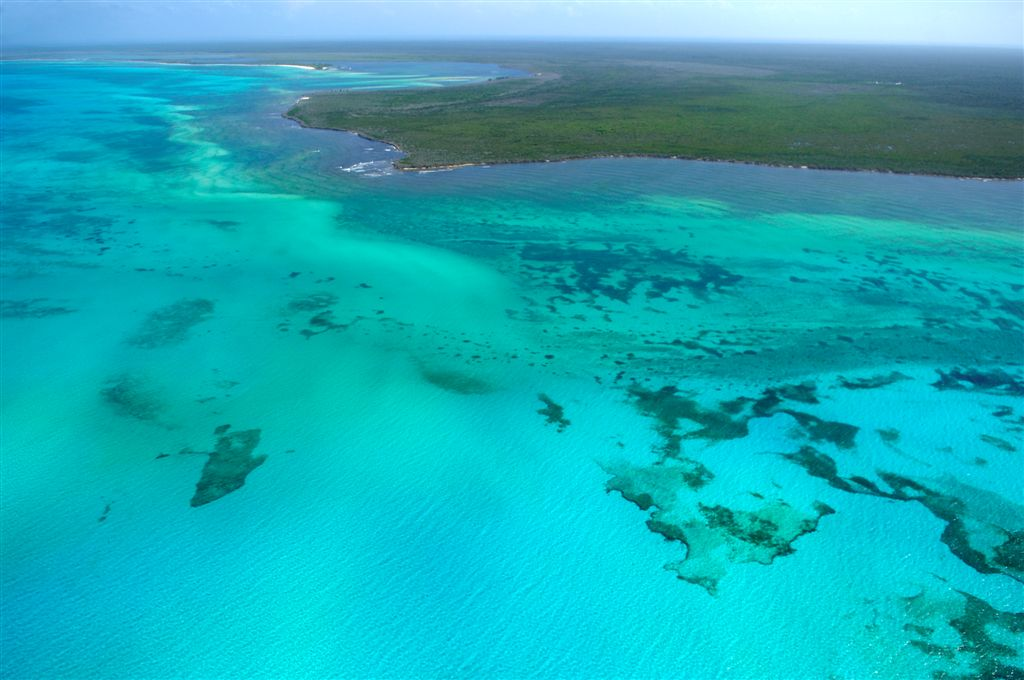
Book « Les plus belles plages du Mexique »

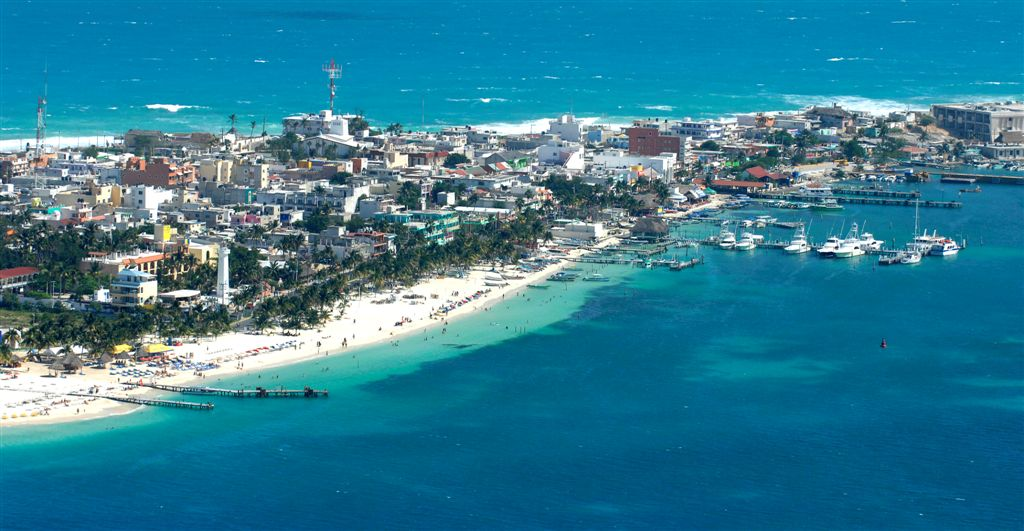
Book « Les plus belles plages du Mexique »

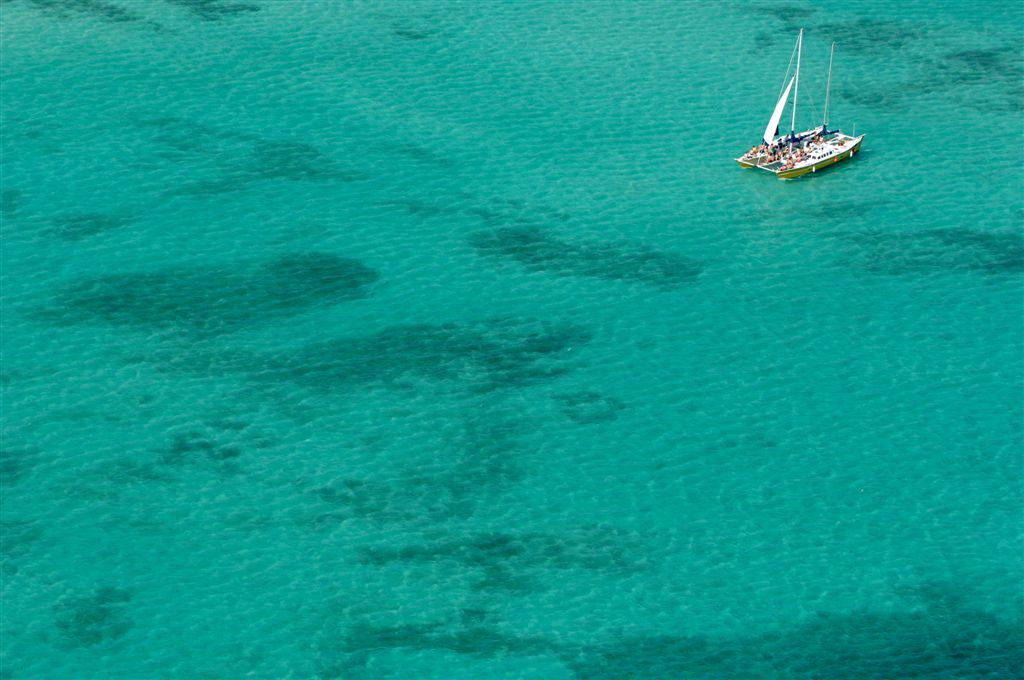
Book « Les plus belles plages du Mexique »

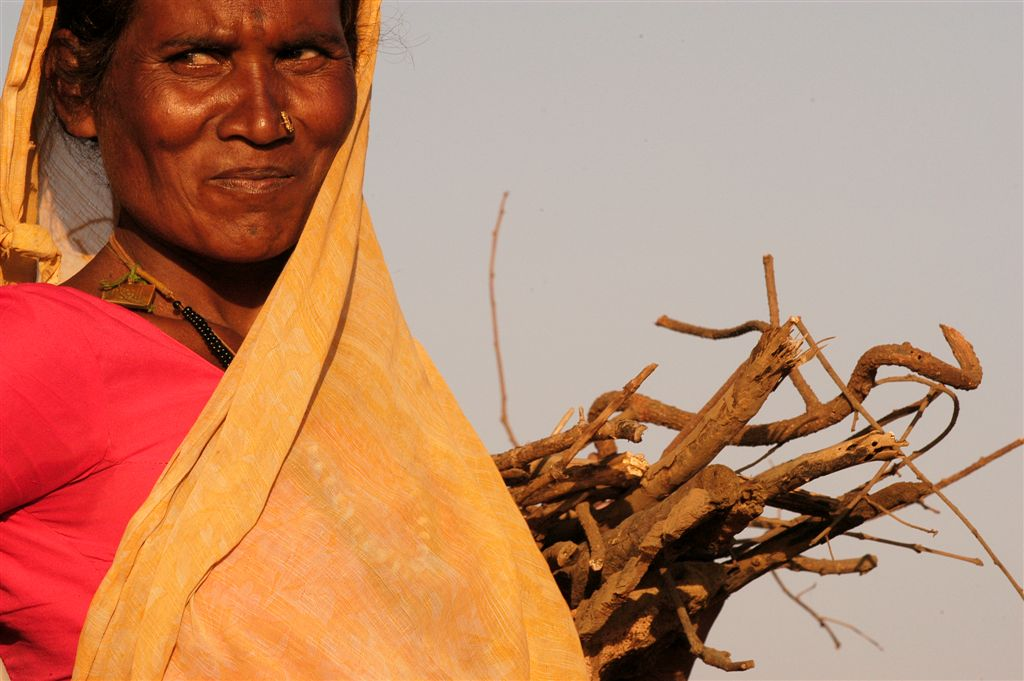
Book cover « Inde, sur la route des Jeunes musiciens du monde »

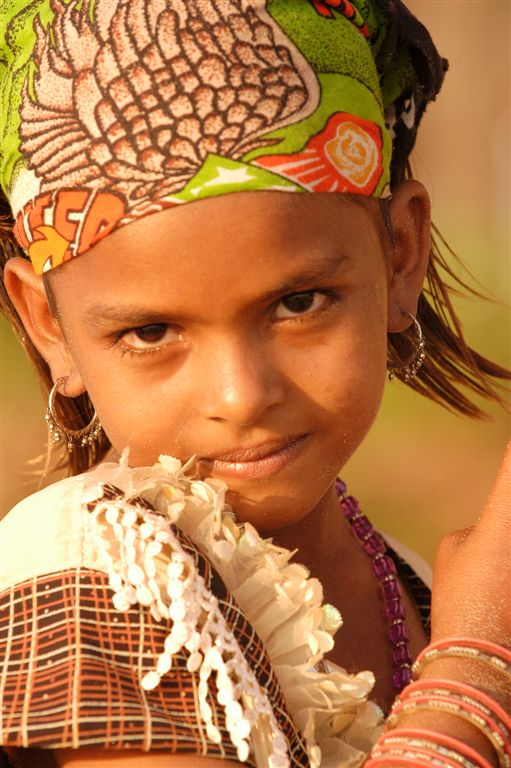
Book cover « Inde, sur la route des Jeunes musiciens du monde »

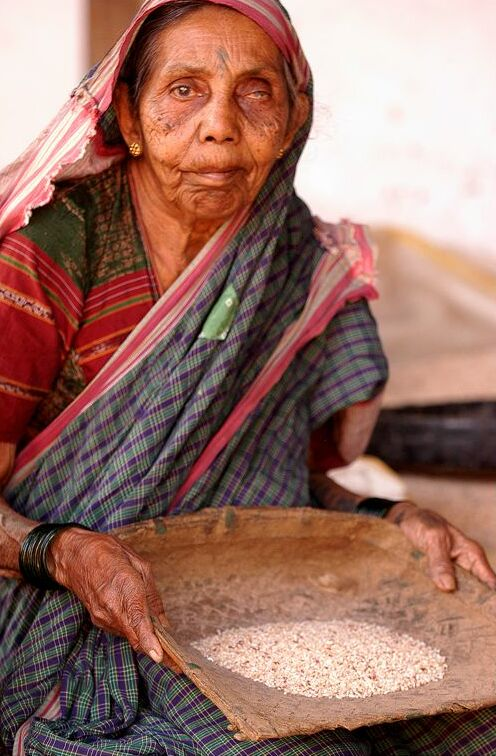
Book « Inde, sur la route des Jeunes musiciens du monde »

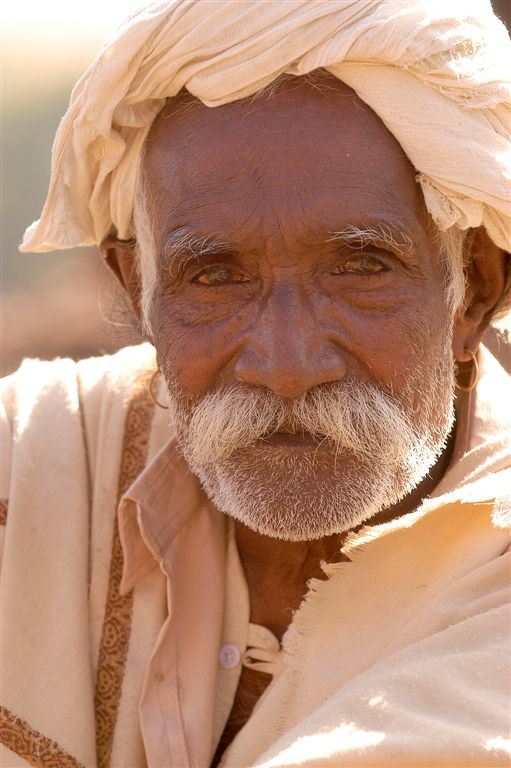
Book « Inde, sur la route des Jeunes musiciens du monde »

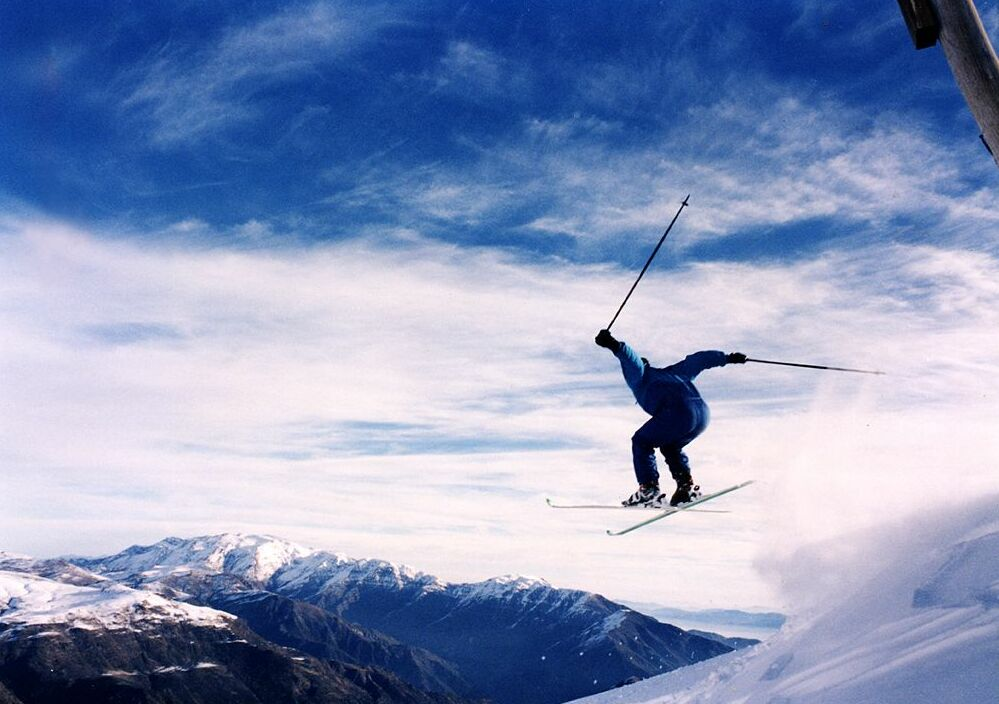
Andes skiing

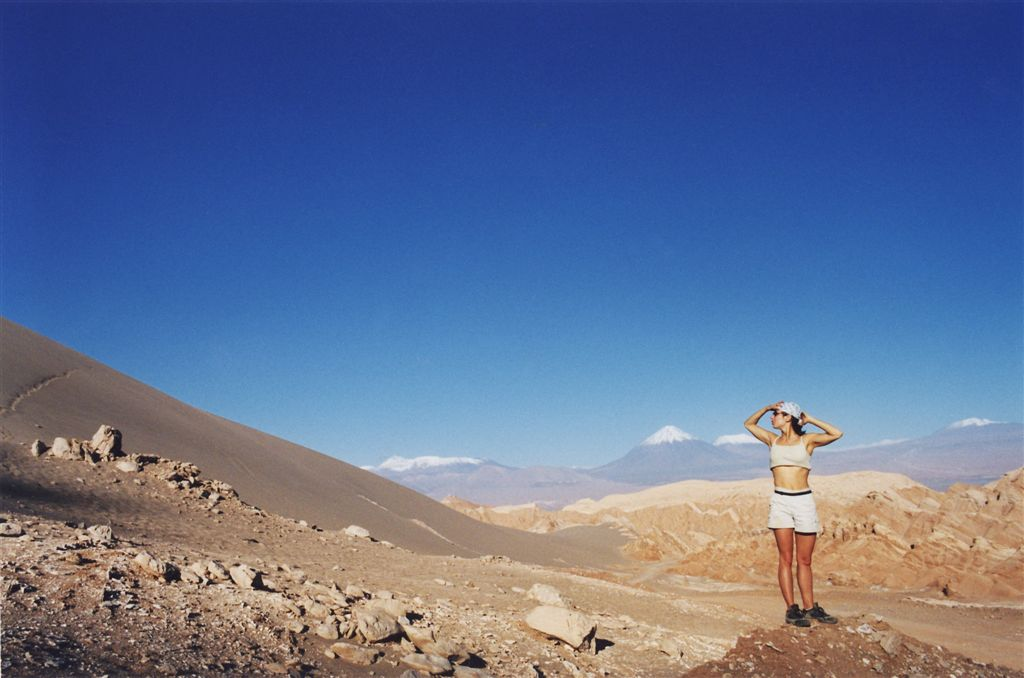
Atacama landscape

=== Other photos ===
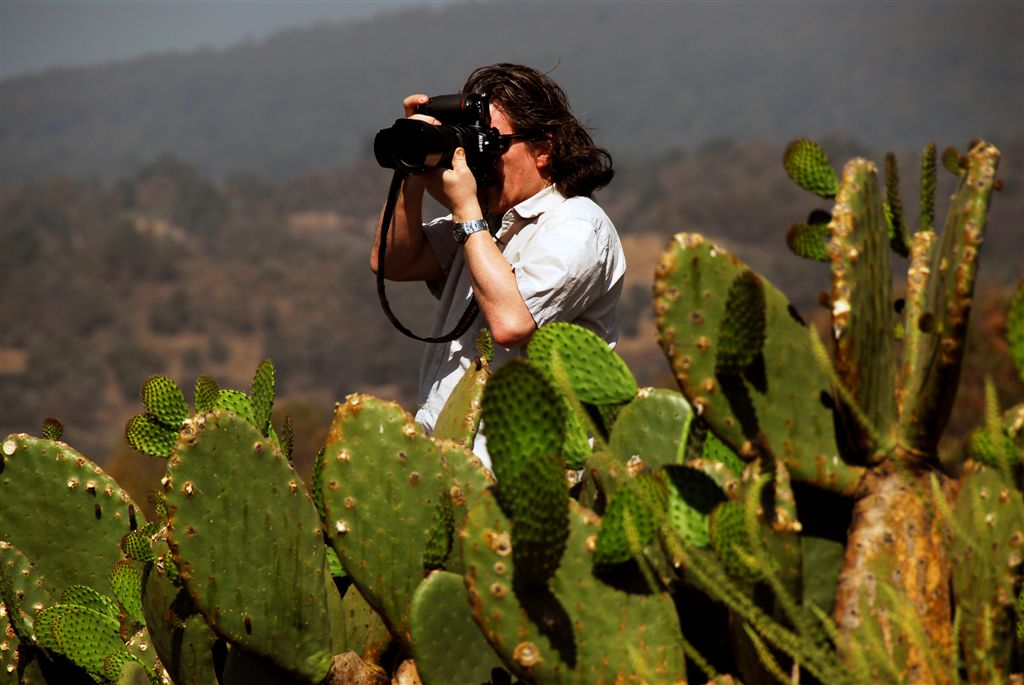
Victor Diaz Lamich in Mexico

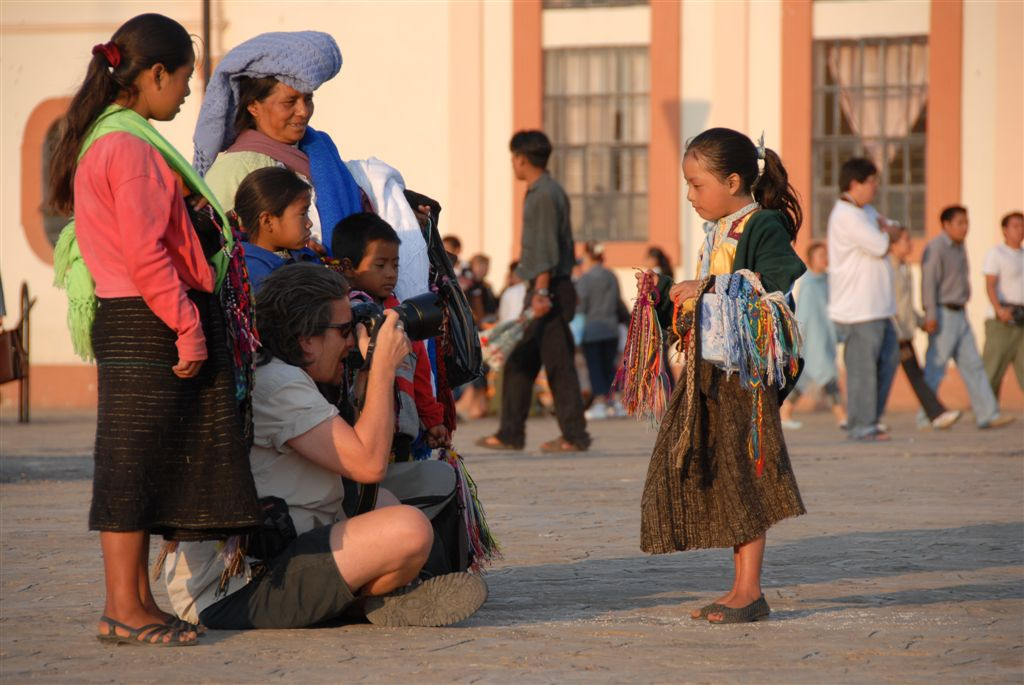
Victor Diaz Lamich in India

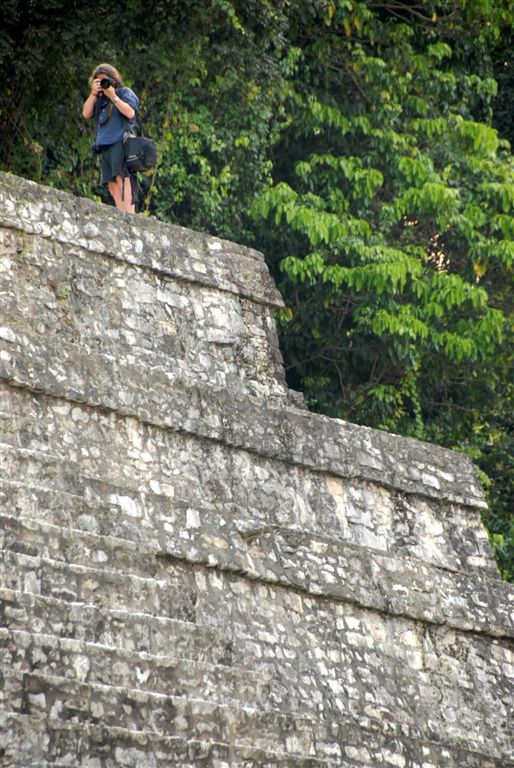
Victor Diaz Lamich in Mexico

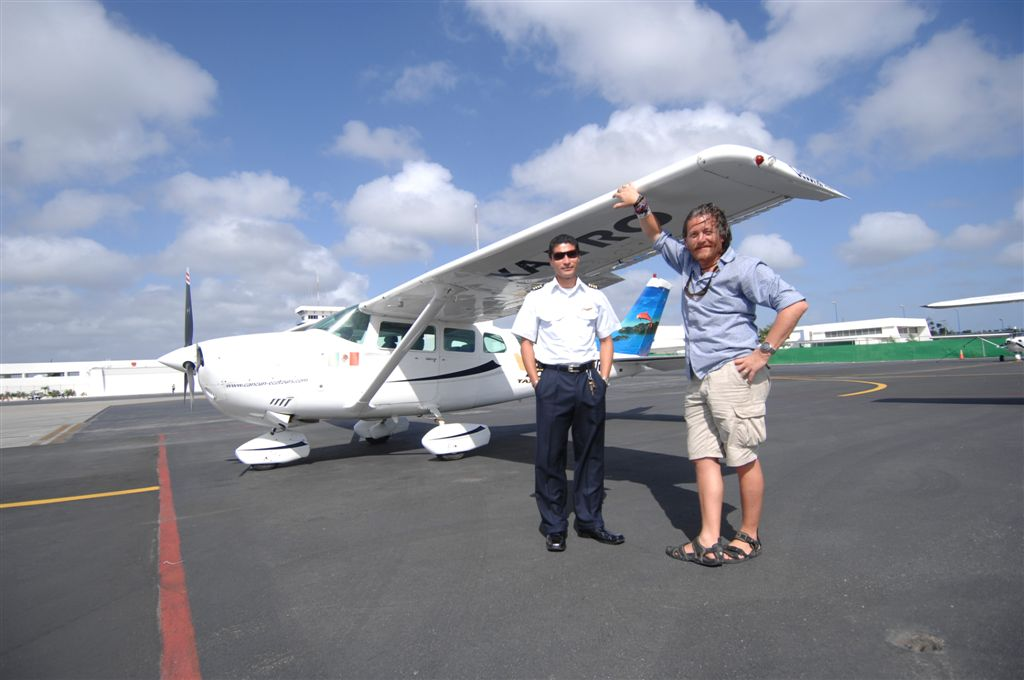
Victor Diaz Lamich in Mexico
