= Barry Hart (academic) =

Australian environmental scientist and academic

Barry Hart AM
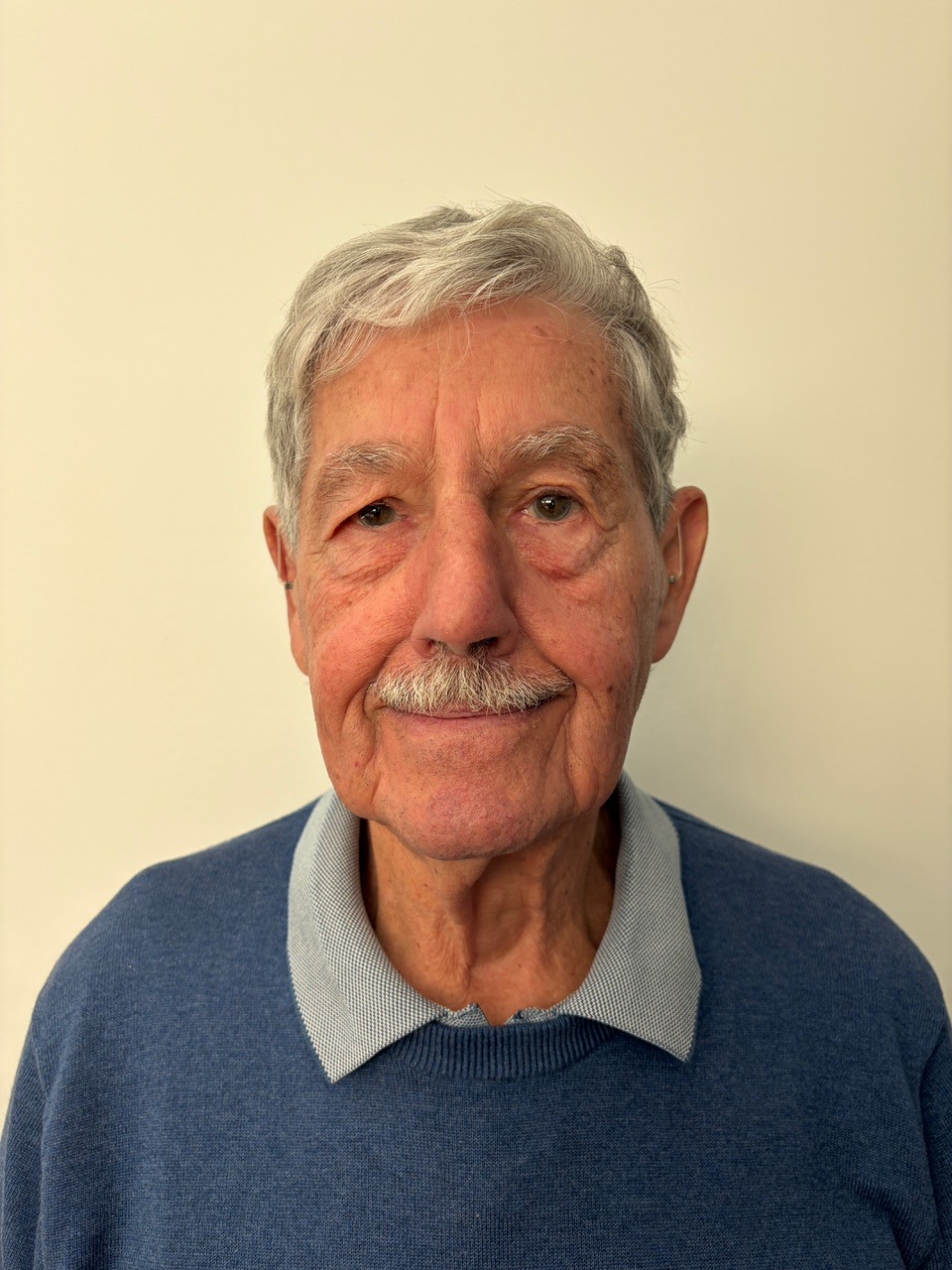
- Born: 1940 (age 85–86); Bairnsdale, Victoria, Australia
- Education: Monash University (BSc, PhD)
- Known for: Research on freshwater ecology, water quality, the Murray–Darling Basin, and the Index of Stream Condition
- Awards: Member of the Order of Australia (2012); Centenary Medal (2001); Environmental Chemistry Medal (1996); Hilary Jolly Medal (1982)
- Scientific career
- Fields: Environmental chemistry, freshwater ecology, water quality, water resource management
- Workplaces: Monash University; Caulfield Institute of Technology; Chisholm Institute of Technology

Barry Thomas Hart AM (born 1940) is an Australian environmental scientist and academic. He is Emeritus Professor of Environmental Chemistry at Monash University. His career has included research in freshwater ecology and water quality, as well as service on the board of the Murray–Darling Basin Authority from 2009 to 2018. In 2012, he was appointed a Member of the Order of Australia (AM) for service to environmental science and water resource management.

== Early life and education ==
Hart grew up in Bairnsdale, Victoria. He earned a Diploma of Applied Chemistry in 1959 and a Diploma in Chemical Engineering in 1963. He then attended Monash University, where he got a Bachelor of Science with first-class honors in 1969 and a PhD in Chemistry in 1972.

== Academic career ==
Hart began his academic career at the Caulfield Institute of Technology (later Chisholm Institute of Technology) in 1968, where he served as Head of the Chemistry and Biology Department from 1976 to 1986.

In 1990, he joined Monash University as Director of the Water Studies Center, a research group focused on aquatic ecosystems and water policy. He was awarded a personal chair in Environmental Chemistry in 1994 and was appointed Emeritus Professor upon his retirement in 2003.

From 1993 to 2002, Hart served as Deputy Director of Research of the Cooperative Research Center for Freshwater Ecology (CRC), contributing to national freshwater research programs.

== Public policy and advisory work ==
Hart served on the board of the Murray–Darling Basin Authority from 2009 to 2018. He was also deputy chair of the Scientific Inquiry into Hydraulic Fracturing of Onshore Unconventional Reservoirs in the Northern Territory, which reported in 2018.In 2019, Hart publicly defended the Murray-Darling Basin Plan against criticisms raised during the South Australian royal commission, arguing that the authority's work was backed by robust and transparent science.

After leaving full-time academia, Hart founded Water Science Pty Ltd. He served as the Chair of the Goyder Institute for Water Research from 2020 to 2023. He was also the Chair of Alluvium Holdings and Alluvium Consulting, retiring from these positions in June 2024.

He has chaired and served on a number of scientific and environmental advisory bodies, including the Commonwealth Environmental Water Scientific Advisory Panel, the Great Barrier Reef Water Quality Partnership Science Advisory Panel, and the Victorian Environment Protection Authority.

== Awards and honors ==
- Hilary Jolly Medal, Australian Society for Limnology (1982)
- Environmental Chemistry Medal, Royal Australian Chemical Institute (1996)
- Brian Bolto Medal (Applied Chemistry Research and Innovation Award), Royal Australian Chemical Institute (1998)
- Centenary Medal, for services to water quality management and environmental protection (2001)
- Member of the Order of Australia (AM) (2012)

== Research and contributions ==
Hart's research has focused on freshwater ecology, water quality, environmental chemistry, salinity, and water resources management. Hart's early research focused on environmental monitoring and river health, contributing to the development of the Index of Stream Condition in Australia. He has also utilized Bayesian networks for ecological risk assessments.

He has also published research on the Murray–Darling Basin, including analyses of the implementation of the Murray–Darling Basin Plan and studies of salinity management. His later work has addressed the management of urban waterways in Melbourne and broader issues relating to water policy and environmental governance.

== Selected journal articles ==
- Hart, B. T.; et al. (1991). "A review of the salt sensitivity of the Australian freshwater biota". Hydrobiologia 210: 105–144.
- Pollino, C. A.; Woodberry, O.; Nicholson, A.; Korb, K.; Hart, B. T. (2007). "Parameterization and evaluation of a Bayesian network for use in an ecological risk assessment". Environmental Modelling & Software 22 (8): 1140–1152.
- Ladson, A. R.; et al. (1999). "Development and testing of an Index of Stream Condition for waterway management in Australia". Freshwater Biology 41 (2): 453–468.
- Hart, B. T. (2016). "The Australian Murray–Darling Basin Plan: Challenges in its Implementation (Part 1)". International Journal of Water Resources Development 32 (6): 819–834.
- Hart, B.T., Walker, G., Katupitiya, A. and Doolan, J. (2020). Salinity Management in the Murray-Darling Basin. Water 12(6):1829.
- Hart, B.T., Francey, M. and Chesterfield, C. (2021). Management of urban waterways in Melbourne, Australia: 1. Current status. Australasian Journal of Water Resources.
