= Philip Gschwend =

American engineer

Philip M. Gschwend is an American engineer focusing on environmental organic chemistry, currently the Ford Professor of Civil and Environmental Engineering at the Massachusetts Institute of Technology.
