= Environmental chemistry =

Scientific study

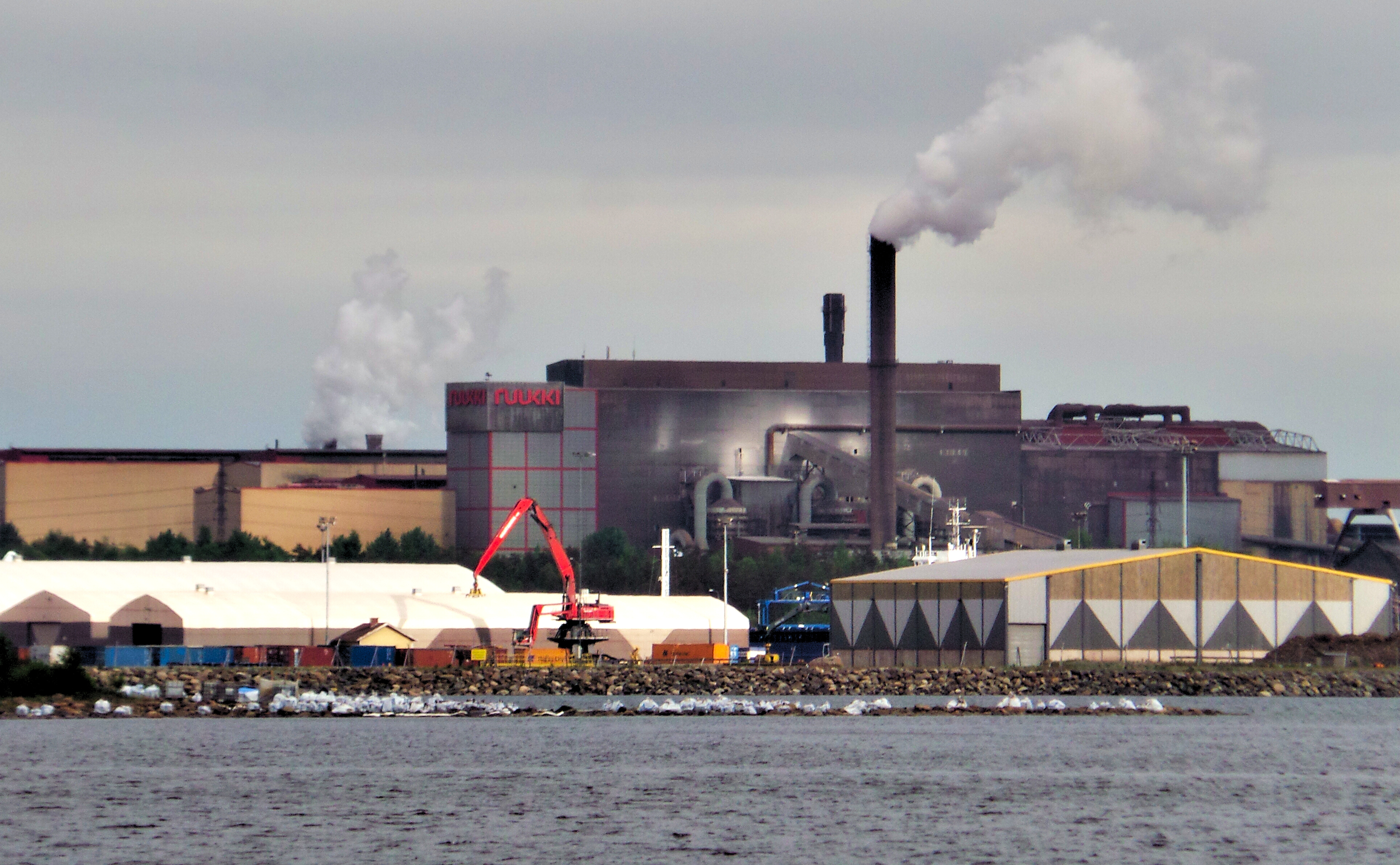
White bags filled with contaminated stones line the shore near an industrial oil spill in Raahe, Finland

Environmental chemistry is the scientific study of the chemical and biochemical phenomena that occur in natural places. It should not be confused with green chemistry, which seeks to reduce potential pollution at its source. It can be defined as the study of the sources, reactions, transport, effects, and fates of chemical species in the air, soil, and water environments; and the effect of human activity and biological activity on these. Environmental chemistry is an interdisciplinary science that includes atmospheric, aquatic and soil chemistry, as well as heavily relying on analytical chemistry and being related to environmental and other areas of science.

Environmental chemistry involves first understanding how the uncontaminated environment works, which chemicals in what concentrations are present naturally, and with what effects. Without this it would be impossible to accurately study the effects humans have on the environment through the release of chemicals.

Environmental chemists draw traditional chemical concepts as well as sampling and analytical techniques.

== Contaminant ==
A contaminant is a substance present in nature at a level higher than fixed levels or that would not otherwise be there. This may be due to human activity and bioactivity. The term contaminant is often used interchangeably with pollutant, which is a substance that detrimentally impacts the surrounding environment. While a contaminant is sometimes a substance in the environment as a result of human activity, but without harmful effects, it is sometimes the case that toxic or harmful effects from contamination only become apparent at a later date.

The "medium" such as soil or organism such as fish affected by the pollutant or contaminant is called a receptor, whilst a sink is a chemical medium or species that retains and interacts with the pollutant such as carbon sink and its effects by microbes.

== Environmental indicators ==
Chemical measures of water quality include dissolved oxygen (DO), chemical oxygen demand (COD), biochemical oxygen demand (BOD), total dissolved solids (TDS), pH, nutrients (nitrates and phosphorus), heavy metals, soil chemicals (including copper, zinc, cadmium, lead and mercury), and pesticides.

== Applications ==
Environmental chemistry often detect and identify the nature and source of pollutants. These pollutants can include:

- Heavy metal contamination of land by industry. These can then be transported into water bodies and be taken up by living organisms such as animals and plants.
- PAHs (Polycyclic Aromatic Hydrocarbon) in large bodies of water contaminated by oil spills or leaks. Many of the PAHs are carcinogens and are extremely toxic. They are regulated by concentration (ppb) using environmental chemistry and chromatography laboratory testing.
- Nutrients leaching from agricultural land into water courses, which can lead to algal blooms and eutrophication.
- Urban runoff of pollutants washing off impervious surfaces (roads, parking lots, and rooftops) during rain storms. Typical pollutants include gasoline, motor oil and other hydrocarbon compounds, metals, nutrients and sediment (soil).
- Organometallic compounds.
- Radiochemicals.

== Methods ==
Quantitative chemical analysis is a key part of environmental chemistry, since it provides the data that frame most environmental studies.

Common analytical techniques used for quantitative determinations in environmental chemistry include classical wet chemistry, such as gravimetric, titrimetric and electrochemical methods. More sophisticated approaches are used in the determination of trace metals and organic compounds. Metals are commonly measured by atomic spectroscopy and mass spectrometry: Atomic Absorption Spectrophotometry (AAS) and Inductively Coupled Plasma Atomic Emission (ICP-AES) or Inductively Coupled Plasma Mass Spectrometric (ICP-MS) techniques. Organic compounds, including PAHs, are commonly measured also using mass spectrometric methods, such as Gas chromatography-mass spectrometry (GC/MS) and Liquid chromatography-mass spectrometry (LC/MS). Tandem Mass spectrometry MS/MS and High Resolution/Accurate Mass spectrometry HR/AM offer sub part per trillion detection. Non-MS methods using GCs and LCs having universal or specific detectors are still staples in the arsenal of available analytical tools.

Radioactive materials are assayed by particle counters and scintillation counter. Bioassays and immunoassays are utilized for toxicity evaluations of chemical effects on various organisms. Polymerase Chain Reaction PCR is able to identify species of bacteria and other organisms through specific DNA and RNA gene isolation and amplification and is showing promise as a valuable technique for identifying environmental microbial contamination.

== Notable environmental chemists ==
Joan Berkowitz
Paul Crutzen (Nobel Prize in Chemistry, 1995)
Philip Gschwend
Alice Hamilton
John M. Hayes
Charles David Keeling
Ralph Keeling
Mario Molina (Nobel Prize in Chemistry, 1995)
James J. Morgan
Clair Patterson
Roger Revelle
Sherry Roland (Nobel Prize in Chemistry, 1995)
Robert Angus Smith
Susan Solomon
Werner Stumm
Ellen Swallow Richards
Hans Suess
John Tyndall

== See also ==
- Environmental monitoring
- Freshwater environmental quality parameters
- Green chemistry
- Green Chemistry Journal
- Journal of Environmental Monitoring
- Important publications in Environmental chemistry
- List of chemical analysis methods
