= Eberlin =

- Language: German

Origin
- Region of origin: Germany

Other names
- Variant form: Eberlein

Eberlin, or Eberlein, is a German surname.

== Eberlin ==
- Daniel Eberlin (1647–c.1714), German composer and violinist
- Johann Eberlin von Günzburg (c.1470–1533), German theologian
- Johann Ernst Eberlin (1702–1762), German composer and organist
- Livia S. Eberlin, Brazilian chemist, daughter of Marcos
- Marcos Nogueira Eberlin (1959–), Brazilian chemist and advocate of intelligent design, father of Livia

== Eberlein ==
- Gerald L. Eberlein, German sociology educator
- Hugo Eberlein, German Communist politician
- Sophia Eberlein (1889–1931), Russian-American woman whose spirit is said to haunt the Harvey Library
- Johann Konrad Eberlein, Austrian art historian
- William Frederick Eberlein, mathematician

== See also ==
- Eberle (disambiguation)
