= Glow discharge =

Plasma formed by passage of current through gas

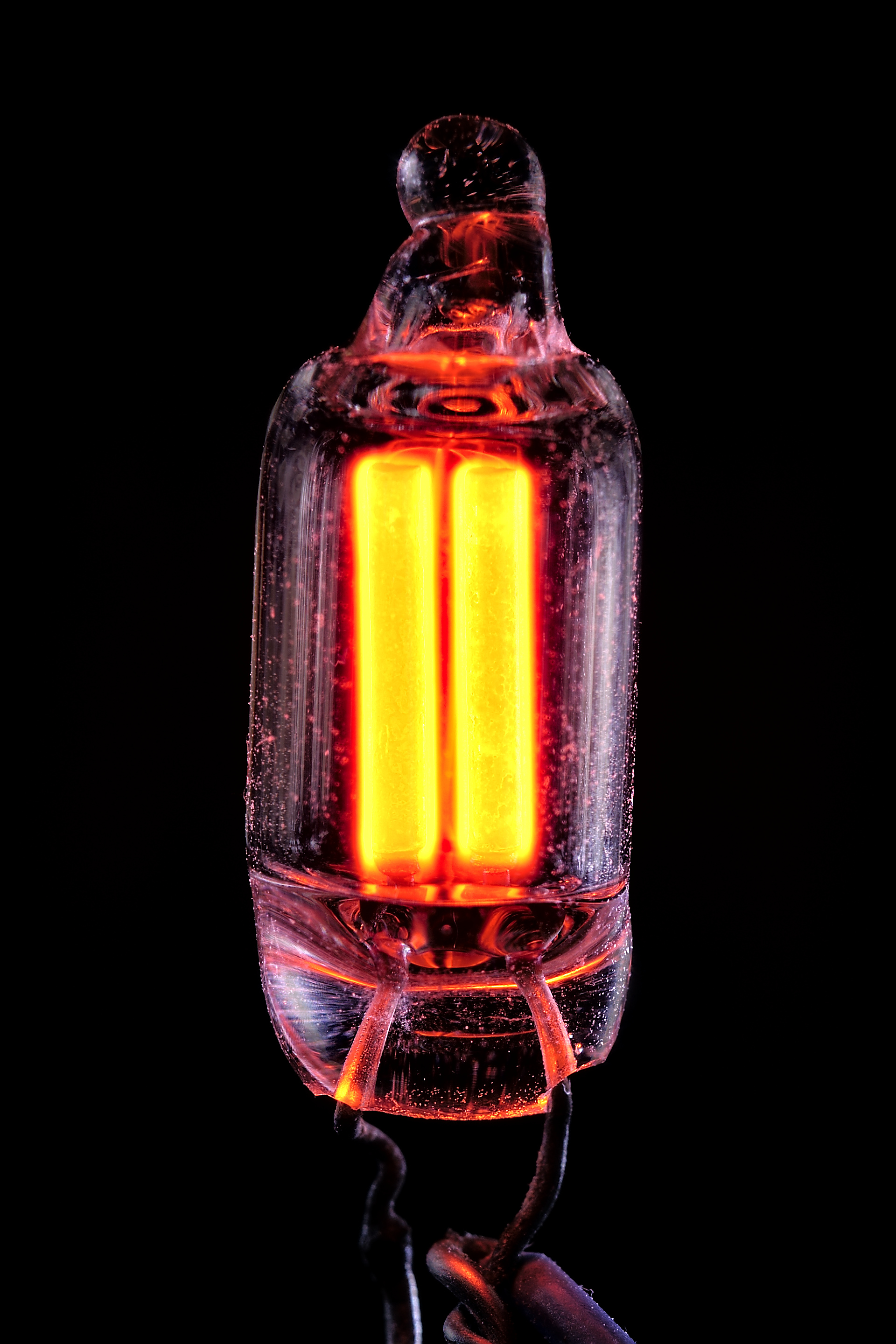
NE-2–type neon lamp powered by alternating current

Glow discharge in a low-pressure tube caused by electric current

A glow discharge is a plasma formed by the passage of electric current through a gas. It is often created by applying a voltage between two electrodes in a glass tube containing a low-pressure gas. When the voltage exceeds a value called the striking voltage, the gas ionization becomes self-sustaining, and the tube glows with a colored light. The color depends on the gas used.

Glow discharges are used as sources of light in devices such as neon lights, cold-cathode fluorescent lamps, and plasma-screen televisions. Analyzing the light produced with spectroscopy can reveal information about the atomic interactions in the gas, so glow discharges are used in plasma physics and analytical chemistry. They are also used in the surface-treatment technique called sputtering.

== Electrical conduction in gas ==
Voltage–current characteristics of electrical discharge in neon at one torr, with two planar electrodes separated by 50 cm. A: random pulses by cosmic radiation B: saturation current C: avalanche Townsend discharge D: self-sustained Townsend discharge E: unstable region: corona discharge F: sub-normal glow discharge G: normal glow discharge H: abnormal glow discharge I: unstable region: glow-arc transition J: electric arc K: electric arc A–D region: dark discharge; ionisation occurs, current below 10 microamps F–H region: glow discharge; the plasma emits a faint glow I–K region: arc discharge; large amounts of radiation produced

Conduction in a gas requires charge carriers, which can be either electrons or ions. Charge carriers come from ionizing some of the gas molecules. Depending on the amount of current passing through the gas, the ionization occurs by one of three different mechanisms: dark discharge, glow discharge, and arc discharge.

- In a dark discharge, the gas is ionized (the carriers are generated) by a radiation source such as ultraviolet light or cosmic rays. At higher voltages across the anode and cathode, the freed carriers can gain enough energy so that additional carriers are freed during collisions; the process is a Townsend avalanche or multiplication.
- In a glow discharge, the carrier-generation process reaches a point where the average electron leaving the cathode allows another electron to leave the cathode. Thus the discharge becomes self-sustaining. For example, the average electron may cause dozens of ionizing collisions via the Townsend avalanche; the resulting positive ions head toward the cathode, and a fraction of those that cause collisions with the cathode will dislodge an electron by secondary emission.
- In an arc discharge, electrons leave the cathode by thermionic emission and field emission, and the gas is ionized by thermal means.

Below the breakdown voltage there is little-to-no glow and the electric field is uniform. When the electric field increases enough to cause ionization, the Townsend discharge starts. When a glow discharge develops, the electric field is considerably modified by the presence of positive ions; the field is concentrated near the cathode. The glow discharge starts as a normal glow. As the current is increased, more of the cathode surface is involved in the glow. When the current is increased above the level where the entire cathode surface is involved, the discharge is known as an abnormal glow. If the current is increased still further, other factors come into play and an arc discharge begins.

== Mechanism ==
The simplest type of glow discharge is a direct-current glow discharge. In its simplest form, it consists of two electrodes in a cell held at low pressure (0.1–10 torr; about 1/10000 to 1/100 of atmospheric pressure). A low pressure is used to increase the mean free path; for a fixed electric field, a longer mean free path allows a charged particle to gain more energy before colliding with another particle. The cell is typically filled with neon, but other gases can also be used. An electric potential of several hundred volts is applied between the two electrodes. A small fraction of the population of atoms within the cell is initially ionized through random processes, such as thermal collisions between atoms or by gamma rays. The positive ions are driven towards the cathode by the electric potential, and the electrons are driven towards the anode by the same potential. The initial population of ions and electrons collides with other atoms, exciting or ionizing them. As long as the potential is maintained, a population of ions and electrons remains.

=== Secondary emission ===
Some of the ions' kinetic energy is transferred to the cathode. This happens partially through the ions striking the cathode directly. The primary mechanism, however, is less direct. Ions strike the more numerous neutral gas atoms, transferring a portion of their energy to them. These neutral atoms then strike the cathode. Whichever species (ions or atoms) strike the cathode, collisions within the cathode redistribute this energy, resulting in electrons ejected from the cathode. This process is known as secondary electron emission. Once free of the cathode, the electric field accelerates electrons into the bulk of the glow discharge. Atoms can then be excited by collisions with ions, electrons, or other atoms that have been previously excited by collisions.

=== Light production ===
Once excited, atoms will lose their energy fairly quickly. Of the various ways that this energy can be lost, the most important is radiatively, meaning that a photon is released to carry the energy away. In optical atomic spectroscopy, the wavelength of this photon can be used to determine the identity of the atom (that is, which chemical element it is), and the number of photons is directly proportional to the concentration of that element in the sample. Some collisions (those of high-enough energy) will cause ionization. In atomic mass spectrometry, these ions are detected. Their mass identifies the type of atoms and their quantity reveals the amount of that element in the sample.

=== Regions ===
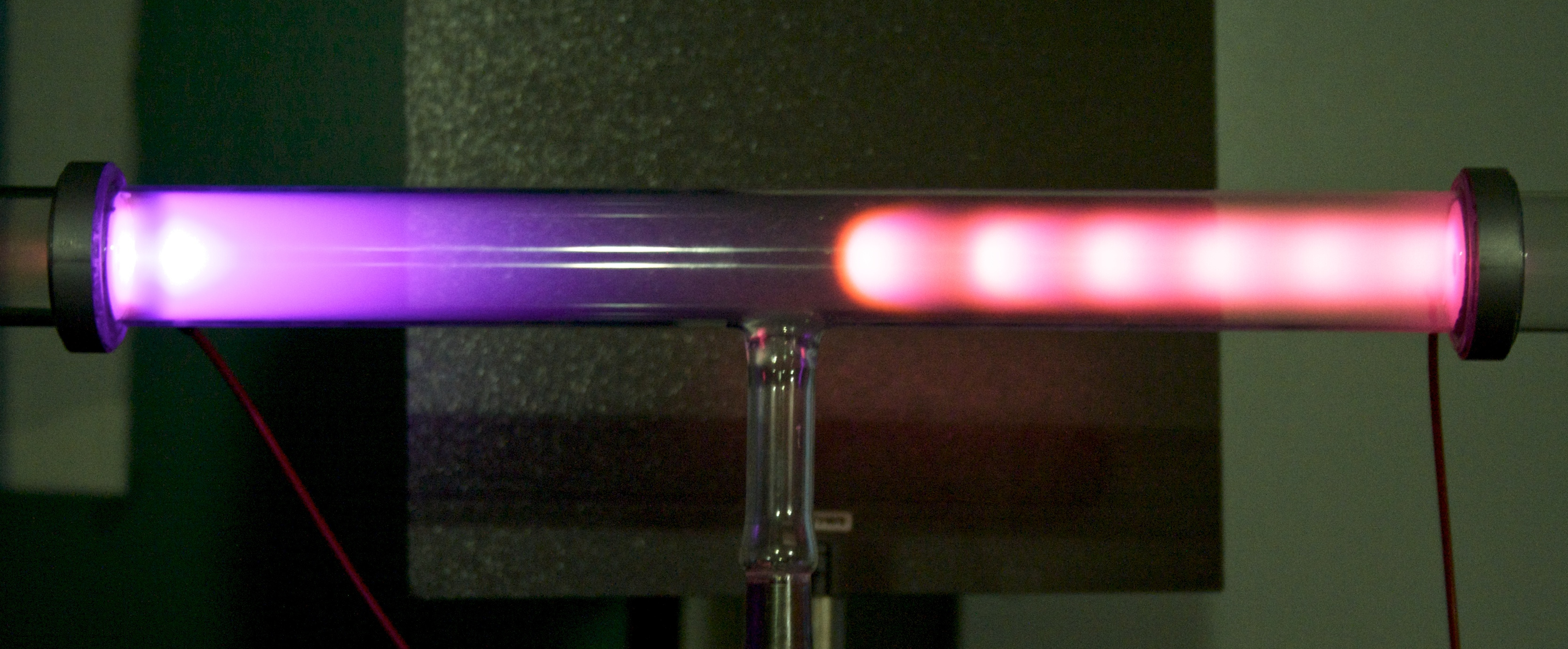
A glow discharge illustrating the different regions comprising it and a diagram giving their names

The illustrations to the right shows the main regions that may be present in a glow discharge. Regions described as "glows" emit significant light; regions labeled as "dark spaces" do not. As the discharge becomes more extended (that is, stretched horizontally in the geometry of the illustrations), the positive column may become striated. That is, alternating dark and bright regions may form. Compressing the discharge horizontally will result in fewer regions. The positive column will be compressed while the negative glow will remain the same size, and, with small-enough gaps, the positive column will disappear altogether. In an analytical glow discharge, the discharge is primarily a negative glow with dark region above and below it.

=== Cathode layer ===
The cathode layer begins with the Aston dark space, and ends with the negative glow region. The cathode layer shortens with increased gas pressure. The cathode layer has a positive space charge and a strong electric field.

==== Aston dark space ====
Electrons leave the cathode with an energy of about one electron volt, which is not enough to ionize or excite atoms, leaving a thin dark layer next to the cathode.

==== Cathode glow ====
Electrons from the cathode eventually attain enough energy to excite atoms. These excited atoms quickly fall back to the ground state, emitting light at a wavelength corresponding to the difference between the energy bands of the atoms. This glow is seen very near the cathode.

==== Cathode dark space ====
As electrons from the cathode gain more energy, they tend to ionize, rather than excite atoms. Excited atoms quickly fall back to ground level, emitting light; however, when atoms are ionized, the opposite charges are separated, and do not immediately recombine. This results in more ions and electrons, but no light. This region is sometimes called Crookes dark space, and sometimes referred to as the cathode fall, because the largest voltage drop in the tube occurs in this region.

==== Negative glow ====
The ionization in the cathode dark space results in a high electron density, but slower electrons, making it easier for the electrons to recombine with positive ions, leading to intense light, through a process called bremsstrahlung radiation.

==== Faraday dark space ====
As the electrons keep losing energy, less light is emitted, resulting in another dark space.

=== Anode layer ===
The anode layer begins with the positive column, and ends at the anode. The anode layer has a negative space charge and a moderate electric field.

==== Positive column ====
With fewer ions, the electric field increases, resulting in electrons with energy of about two electron volts, which is enough to excite atoms and produce light. With longer glow discharge tubes, the longer space is occupied by a longer positive column, while the cathode layer remains the same. For example, with a neon sign, the positive column occupies almost the entire length of the tube.

==== Anode glow ====
An electric field increase results in the anode glow.

==== Anode dark space ====
As the electric field increases again, the electron number increases due to increased ionization, but their average energy increases as well, meaning that most collisions result in ionization instead of excitation.

=== Striations ===
Bands of alternating light and dark in the positive column are called striations. There is no universal mechanism explaining the striations for all conditions of gas and pressure producing them, but recent theoretical and modelling studies, supported with experimental results, mention the importance of the Dufour effect.

=== Sputtering ===
In addition to causing secondary emission, positive ions can strike the cathode with sufficient force to eject particles of the material from which the cathode is made. This process is called sputtering and it gradually ablates the cathode. Sputtering is useful when using spectroscopy to analyze the composition of the cathode, as is done in glow-discharge optical emission spectroscopy.

However, sputtering is not desirable when glow discharge is used for lighting, because it shortens the life of the lamp. For example, neon signs have hollow cathodes designed to minimize sputtering, and contain charcoal to continuously remove undesired ions and atoms.

=== Carrier gas ===
In the context of sputtering, the gas in the tube is called carrier gas because it carries the particles from the cathode.

=== Color difference ===
Because of sputtering occurring at the cathode, the colors emitted from regions near the cathode are quite different from the anode. Particles sputtered from the cathode are excited and emit radiation from the metals and oxides that make up the cathode. The radiation from these particles combines with radiation from excited carrier gas, giving the cathode region a white or blue color, while in the rest of the tube, radiation is only from the carrier gas and tends to be more monochromatic.

Electrons near the cathode are less energetic than the rest of the tube. Surrounding the cathode is a negative field, which slows electrons as they are ejected from the surface. Only those electrons with the highest velocity are able to escape this field, and those without enough kinetic energy are pulled back into the cathode. Once outside the negative field, the attraction from the positive field begins to accelerate these electrons toward the anode. During this acceleration, electrons are deflected and slowed down by positive ions speeding toward the cathode, which in turn produces bright blue-white bremsstrahlung radiation in the negative glow region.

== Use in analytical chemistry ==
Glow discharges can be used to analyze the elemental, and sometimes molecular, compositions of solids, liquids, and gases, but elemental analysis of solids is the most common. In this arrangement, the sample is used as the cathode. As mentioned earlier, gas ions and atoms striking the sample surface knock atoms off of it, a process known as sputtering.

The sputtered atoms, now in the gas phase, can be detected by atomic absorption, but this is a comparatively rare strategy. Instead, atomic emission and mass spectrometry are usually used.

Collisions between the gas-phase sample atoms and the plasma gas pass energy to the sample atoms. This energy can excite the atoms, after which they can lose their energy through atomic emission. By observing the wavelength of the emitted light, the atom's identity can be determined. By observing the intensity of the emission, the concentration of atoms of that type can be determined.

Energy gained through collisions can also ionize the sample atoms. The ions can then be detected by mass spectrometry. In this case, it is the masses of the ions that identify the elements and the number of ions that reflect the concentration. This method is referred to as glow discharge mass spectrometry (GDMS), and it has detection limits down to the sub-ppb range for most elements that are nearly matrix-independent.

=== Depth analysis ===
Both bulk and depth analysis of solids may be performed with glow discharge. Bulk analysis assumes that the sample is fairly homogeneous and averages the emission or mass spectrometric signal over time. Depth analysis relies on tracking the signal in time, therefore, is the same as tracking the elemental composition in depth.

Depth analysis requires greater control over operational parameters. For example, conditions (current, potential, pressure) need to be adjusted so that the crater produced by sputtering is flat-bottomed (that is, so that the depth analyzed over the crater area is uniform). In bulk measurement, a rough or rounded crater bottom would not adversely impact analysis. Under the best conditions, depth resolution in the single nanometer range has been achieved (in fact, within-molecule resolution has been demonstrated).

The chemistry of ions and neutrals in vacuum is called gas-phase ion chemistry and is part of the analytical study that includes glow discharge.

== Powering modes ==
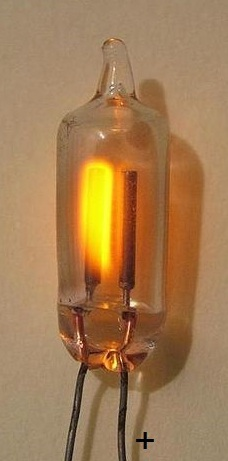
DC-powered neon lamp, showing glow discharge surrounding only the cathode

In analytical chemistry, glow discharges are usually operated in direct-current mode. For direct current, the cathode (which is the sample in solids analysis) must be conductive. In contrast, analysis of a nonconductive cathode requires the use of a high-frequency alternating current.

The potential, pressure, and current are interrelated. Only two can be directly controlled at once, while the third must be allowed to vary. The pressure is most typically held constant, but other schemes may be used. The pressure and current may be held constant, while potential is allowed to vary. The pressure and voltage may be held constant while the current is allowed to vary. The power (product of voltage and current) may be held constant while the pressure is allowed to vary.

Glow discharges may also be operated in at radio frequencies. The use of this band establishes a negative DC-bias voltage on the sample surface. The DC bias is the result of an alternating-current waveform that is centered about negative potential; as such it more-or-less represents the average potential residing on the sample surface. Radio frequency has the ability to appear to flow through insulators (nonconductive materials).

Both radio-frequency and direct-current glow discharges can be operated in pulsed mode, where the potential is turned on and off. This allows higher instantaneous powers to be applied without excessively heating the cathode. These higher instantaneous powers produce higher instantaneous signals, aiding detection. Combining time-resolved detection with pulsed powering results in additional benefits. In atomic emission, analyte atoms emit during different portions of the pulse than background atoms, allowing the two to be discriminated. Analogously, in mass spectrometry, sample and background ions are created at different times.

== Application to analog computing ==
An interesting application for using glow discharge was described in a 2002 scientific paper by Ryes, Ghanem et al. According to a Nature news article describing the work, researchers at Imperial College London demonstrated how they built a mini-map that glows along the shortest route between two points. The Nature news article describes the system as follows:

To make the one-inch London chip, the team etched a plan of the city centre on a glass slide. Fitting a flat lid over the top turned the streets into hollow, connected tubes. They filled these with helium gas, and inserted electrodes at key tourist hubs. When a voltage is applied between two points, electricity naturally runs through the streets along the shortest route from A to B – and the gas glows like a tiny neon strip light.

The approach itself provides a novel visible analog computing approach for solving a wide class of maze-searching problems based on the properties of lighting up of a glow discharge in a microfluidic chip.

== Application to voltage regulation ==
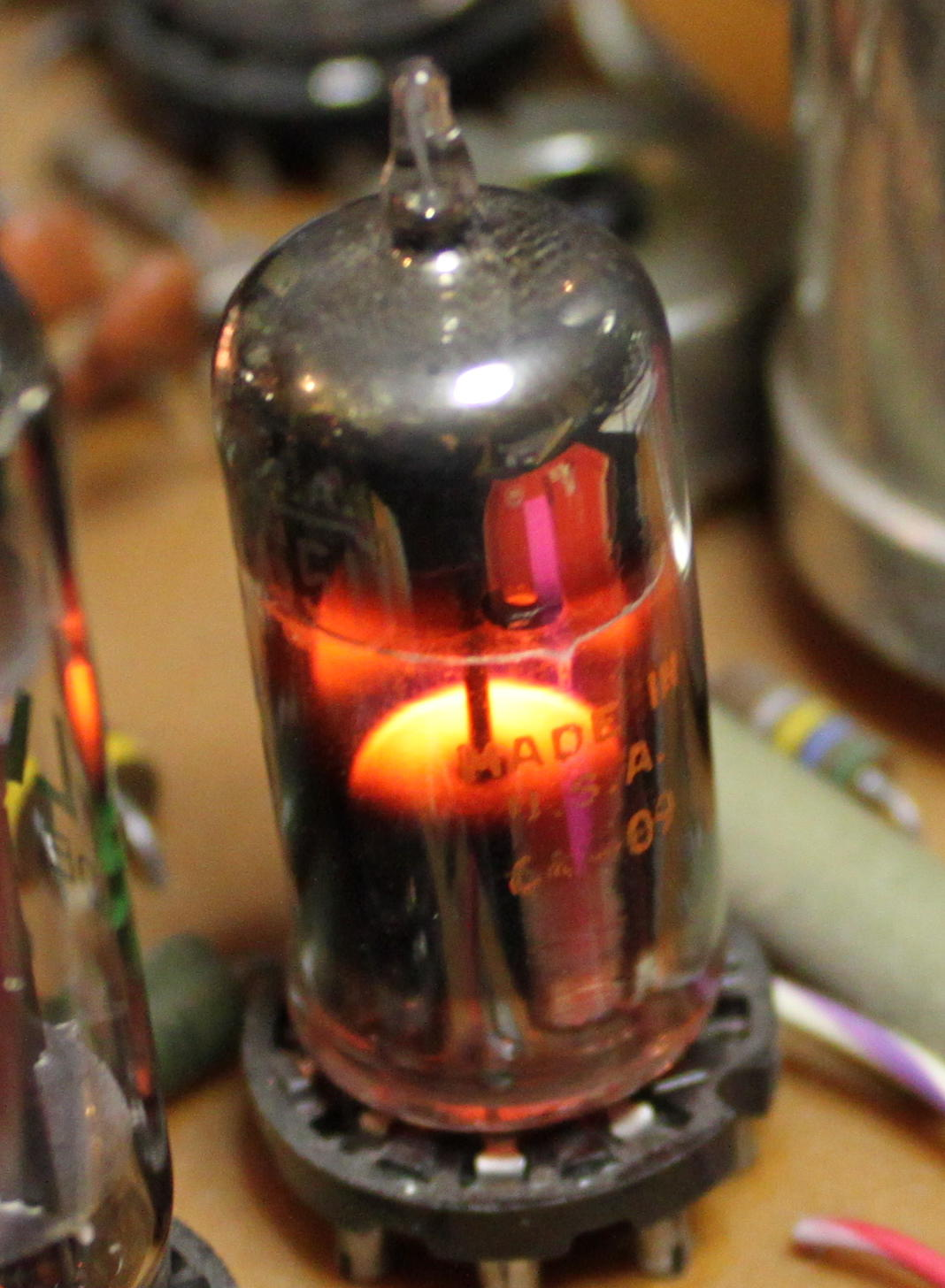
A 5651 voltage-regulator tube in operation

In the mid-20th century, prior to the development of solid state components such as Zener diodes, voltage regulation in circuits was often accomplished with voltage-regulator tubes, which used glow discharge.

== See also ==
- Electric arc discharge
- Electric spark
- Electrical breakdown
- Electrostatic discharge
- Fluorescent lamp, neon lamp, and plasma lamp
- Nixie tube
- Vacuum arc
- X-ray tube
