= R. Graham Cooks =

American chemist

Robert Graham Cooks
- Born: Benoni, South Africa
- Education: University of Natal; Cambridge University
- Known for: Mass Spectrometry
- Scientific career
- Fields: Chemistry, Mass spectrometry
- Workplaces: Purdue University
- Doctoral advisor: Frank L. Warren; Peter Sykes
- Doctoral students: Jennifer S. Brodbelt; Gary Glish; Livia S. Eberlin; Scott A. McLuckey; Vicki Wysocki; Abraham Badu-Tawiah

Notes
- Boyle Medal; Member, National Academy of Sciences; Aston Medal

Robert Graham Cooks is the Henry Bohn Hass Distinguished Professor of Chemistry in the Aston Laboratories for Mass Spectrometry at Purdue University. He is an ISI Highly Cited Chemist, with over 1,000 publications and an H-index of 150.

== Education ==
Cooks received Bachelor of Science and Master of Science degrees from the University of Natal in South Africa in 1961 and 1963, respectively. He received a Ph.D. from the University of Natal in 1965 and a second Ph.D. from Cambridge University in 1967, where he worked with Peter Sykes. He then did post-doctoral work at Cambridge with Dudley Williams.

== Career ==
Cooks became an assistant professor at Kansas State University from 1968 to 1971. In 1971, he took a position at Purdue University. He became a professor of chemistry in 1980 and was appointed the Henry Bohn Hass Distinguished Professor in 1990. Cooks was co-editor of the Annual Review of Analytical Chemistry from 2013 to 2017.

== Select research interests ==
Research in Cooks' laboratory (the Aston Laboratories) has contributed to a diverse assortment of areas within mass spectrometry, ranging from fundamental research to instrument and method development to applications. Cooks' research interests over the course of his career have included the study of gas-phase ion chemistry, tandem mass spectrometry, angle-resolved mass spectrometry and energy-resolved mass spectrometry (ERMS); dissociation processes, including collision-induced dissociation (CID), surface-induced dissociation (SID), and photodissociation (PD); and desorption processes, including secondary ion mass spectrometry (SIMS), laser desorption ionization (LDI) and desorption electrospray ionization (DESI).

His research has ranged through areas from preparative mass spectrometry, ionization techniques and quadrupole ion traps (QITs) and related technologies to as far afield as abiogenisis (also known as "the origin of life") via homochirality.

== Awards and fellowships ==
- 1984 ACS Analytical Division's Chemical Instrumentation Award;
- 1985 Thomson Medal for International Service to Mass Spectrometry;
- 1990 and 1995 NSF Special Creativity Award;
- 1991 Frank H. Field & Joe Franklin Award, (ACS Award for Mass Spectrometry);
- 1997 Fisher Award (ACS Award for Analytical Chemistry);
- 2006 Distinguished Contribution in Mass Spectrometry Award;
- 2008 Robert Boyle Prize for Analytical Science;
- 2012 F.A. Cotton Medal for Excellence in Chemical Research of the American Chemical Society;
- 2013 Dreyfus Prize in the Chemical Sciences;
- 2014 ACS Nobel Laureate Signature Award for Graduate Education in Chemistry, shared with graduate student Livia S. Eberlin;
- 2015 Member, National Academy of Sciences;
- 2017 Aston Medal, British Mass Spectrometry Society.

== See also ==
- Desorption electrospray ionization
- MIKES
- Orbitrap
