= Robert Boyle Prize for Analytical Science =

Biannual Royal Society of Chemistry award

- Awarded for: Contributions to analytical chemistry
- Sponsored by: Royal Society of Chemistry
- Date: 1982; 44 years ago
- Country: United Kingdom (international)
- Formerly called: Boyle Medal
- Reward: £5000
- Website: Official website

Robert Boyle Prize for Analytical Science, formerly called Boyle Medal, is a prize of the Royal Society of Chemistry for Analytical Chemistry. It is awarded every two years and is worth £5,000. The prize is named after Robert Boyle, and was awarded from 1982 to 2020, when it was combined with the Sir George Stokes Award, with the pair making the Analytical Science Horizon Prize.

== Award winners ==
Winners include:

- 1982: Alan Walsh
- 1984: Izaak Kolthoff
- 1986: Ernö Pungor
- 1988: Egon Stahl
- 1990: Hanns Malissa, Ivan Alimarin
- 1992: Fred W. McLafferty
- 1994: Taitiro Fujinaga
- 1996: James D. Winefordner
- 1998: William H. Pirkle
- 2000: William Horwitz
- 2002: Michael Thompson
- 2004: Miguel Valcárcel
- 2006: not awarded
- 2008: R. Graham Cooks
- 2010: Gary M. Hieftje
- 2012: Norman Dovichi
- 2014: Eric Bakker
- 2016: Richard Peter Evershed
- 2018: Richard G. Compton
- 2020: Kourosh Kalantar-zadeh

The Robert Boyle Prize for Analytical Science was discontinued after 2020. The prize has been replaced by the RSC's Analytical Science Horizon Prize, which is awarded to groups and teams for recent and innovative advances in the field of analytical chemistry.

== See also ==
- List of chemistry awards
