= Mass-analyzed ion-kinetic-energy spectrometry =

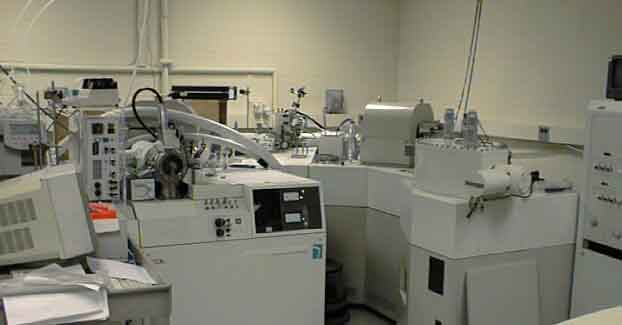
MIKES instrument

Mass-analyzed ion kinetic-energy spectrometry (MIKES) is a mass spectrometry technique by which mass spectra are obtained from a sector instrument that incorporates at least one magnetic sector plus one electric sector in reverse geometry (the beam first enters the magnetic sector). The accelerating voltage V, and the magnetic field B, are set to select the precursor ions of a particular m/z. The precursor ions then dissociate or react in an electric field-free region between the two sectors. The ratio of the kinetic energy to charge of the product ions are analyzed by scanning the electric sector field E. The width of the product ion spectrum peaks is related to the kinetic energy release distribution for the dissociation process.

== History ==
MIKES was developed at Purdue University in 1973 by Beynon, Cooks, J. W. Amy, W. E. Baitinger, and T. Y. Ridley. MIKES was invented because researches at Purdue and Cornell thought that if the parent ion was mass-selected before the dissociation and mass analysis of the products by the electric sector it would be easier to study the metastable ions and the collision-induced dissociation (CID). This was an achievement because it combined the utility of previous instruments such as the ion kinetic energy spectrometer with the ability to mass select precursor ions. That precursor ion is mass selected with the magnetic sector. The dissociation products are then mass analyzed using the electric sector. "The peak shapes revealed from the electric sector scan can provide information on the kinetic energy release from in the course of fragmentation and on the kinetic energy uptake in the course of ionic collision processes." The dispersion of velocities due to kinetic energy release leads to the characteristic wide metastable peaks observed using MIKES techniques.

== Application ==
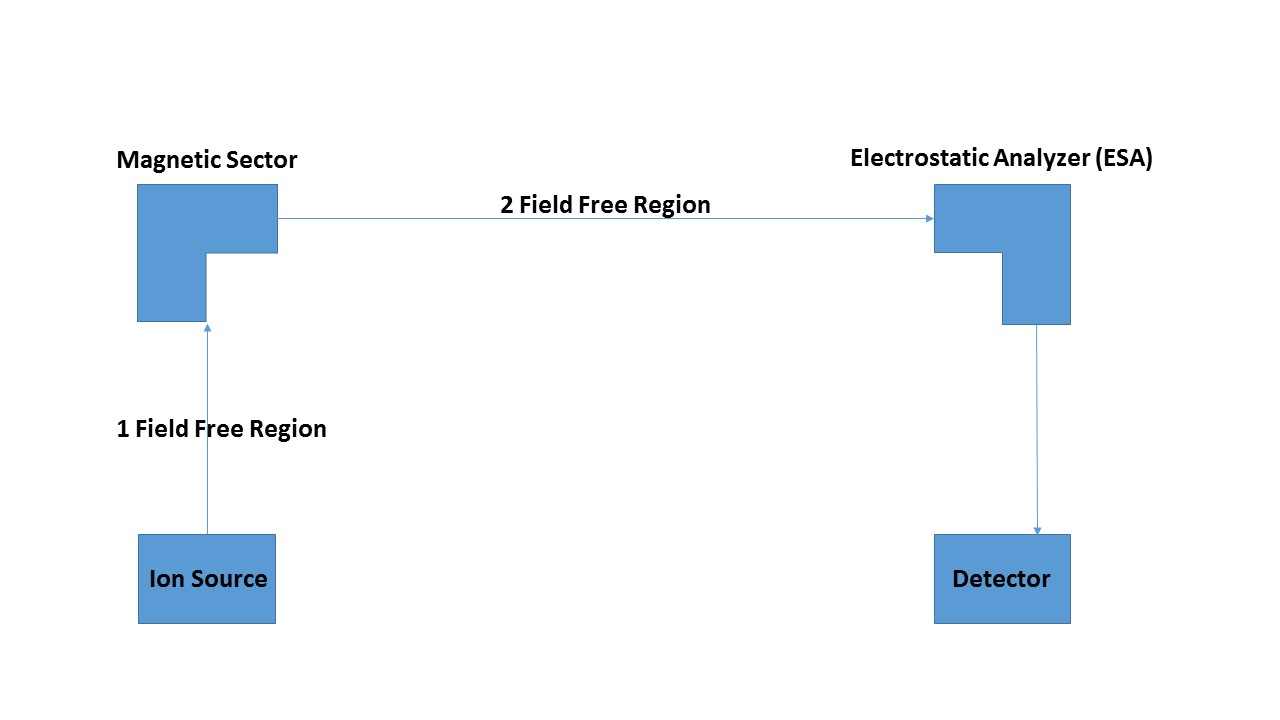
Schematic diagram of MIKES

MIKES is a powerful technique used for structural studies of organic compounds, gaseous ions, and also for direct analysis of complex mixtures without separation of the components. In other words, it is used for molecular structure studies. The reason why MIKES is good for molecular structure studies is due to the reverse-geometry of MIKES. The MIKES Schematic shows that the ion species in the source goes into the magnetic field. After which, the chemistry is later studied in the second field-free region (FFR) by scanning the electric sector which defines the nature of the fragments by measuring their kinetic energy. This causes competitive unimolecular fragmentations that can be observed in the MIKE spectra. Furthermore, if gas is brought into the second FFR, more dissociation will be induced by collision, that will later appear in the MIKE spectra.

== Tandem MS scan ==
This scan uses reverse-geometry (BE-type) instruments. These instruments use a front-end magnetic sector that allows for exclusive mass selection of the precursor ion. The fragmentation region is in-between the two analyzers. The electric sector scan gives the product-ion spectrum. MIKES can also be used for direct measurement of kinetic-energy release values.

== Advantages ==
MIKES, as the name implies, is used for kinetic energy spectrometery. This means that certain criteria are needed to accomplish this. One such feature of MIKES is that it has high kinetic energy resolution and good angular resolution. This is due to the fact that MIKES has low accelerating voltage, around 3 kilo-volts. Another feature is that it has good differential pumping between the various regions of the instrument. In addition, MIKES has multiple systems for bringing in and/or overseeing collision gases or vapors and the ability to vary slit height and width. This prevents favoritism when determining kinetic energy distributions. Although common now, back in the 1970s, MIKES had a great computer compatibility that allowed for readily obtainable molecular structures.

== Disadvantages ==
A disadvantage to MIKES is that observations are made later in the ion flight path when compared to other methods. Also, a smaller number of ions will typically decompose. This will in turn cause the sensitivity to be lower than other kinetic energy spectroscopy methods.

== See also ==
- Gas phase ion chemistry
- Unimolecular ion decomposition
- R. Graham Cooks
