= Peter Sykes =

Peter Sykes may refer to:

- Peter Sykes (director) (1939–2006), Australian/British film director
- Peter Sykes (chemist) (1923–2003), British chemist
