= Ivan Alimarin =

Soviet chemist

- Born: 11 September [O.S. 29 August] 1903; Moscow, Russian Empire
- Died: 17 December 1989 (aged 86); Moscow, Soviet Union
- Resting place: Moscow, Rogozhsky cemetery
- Citizenship: Russian Empire, Soviet Union
- Education: Moscow State University
- Awards: Hero of Socialist Labour, Order of Lenin, USSR State Prize
- Scientific career
- Fields: Analytical chemistry
- Institutions: Moscow State University, Moscow State University of Fine Chemical Technologies

Ivan Pavlovich Alimarin (Russian: Иван Павлович Алимарин, September 11, 1903 – December 17, 1989) was a Soviet analytical chemist, academician of the Academy of Sciences of the Soviet Union (1966), Laureate of the State Prize of the USSR (1972), and Hero of Socialist Labor (1980). Alimarin's scientific activity covered several problems in analytical chemistry, including mineral analysis, and impurity detection in semiconductors.

== Biography ==
=== Chronology ===
- In 1923, Alimarin graduated from the Moscow Commercial College as a chemical technologist.
- Between 1923 and 1953, Alimarin worked at the Institute of Applied Mineralogy.
- Between 1926 and 1928, Alimarin studied at the Moscow Mining Academy.
- Between 1929 and 1936, Alimarin developed colourimetric methods for the determination of fluorine, silicon, and germanium.
- In 1935, Alimarin became a Candidate of Chemical Sciences.
- Between 1935 and 1949, Alimarin researched co-deposition, electrolysis on mercury cathodes, electro-osmosis, extraction with organic solvents, and distillation of volatile compounds.
- Between 1949 and 1989, Alimarin headed the Institute of Geochemistry and Analytical Chemistry (GEOHI) laboratory. The institution had several name changes during his time there.
- In 1950, Alimarin successfully defended his doctoral thesis, titled "Theoretical Foundations of the Analytical Chemistry of Niobium and Tantalum and new methods for Their Determination".
- In 1953, Alimarin became a corresponding member of the Academy of Sciences of the Soviet Union.
- Between 1953 and 1989, Alimarin headed the Department of Analytical Chemistry at Moscow State University (MSU).
- Between 1963 and 1988, Alimarin was the editor-in-chief of the Journal of Analytical Chemistry.
- In 1966, Alimarin was awarded the title of academician of the Academy of Sciences of the Soviet Union.
- In 1972, Alimarin was awarded the USSR State Prize for his achievements in the analysis of high-purity materials at GEOHI.
- In 1980, Alimarin became the Hero of Socialist Labor.
- Alimarin died on December 17, 1989. He was buried in the Rogozhskoe Cemetery in Moscow.

=== Early years ===
Alimarin was born into a family of civil servants. His father was an accountant. Alimarin graduated from the Moscow City Elementary School in 1915 and entered the Moscow Commercial School, where he first displayed interest in the natural sciences. During his time at the Moscow Commercial School, Alimarin studied analytical chemistry from a book by Nikolai Menshutkin. Alimarin's interest in chemistry was noticed by his petrography professor, whom he cites as an influence.

=== Further life ===
In the 1920s, Alimarin worked as a laboratory assistant and chemistry teacher at the Plekhanov Institute of National Economy. Alimarin supervised inorganic and analytical chemistry courses under the guidance of his professors. In 1923, after graduating from college, Alimarin was invited to the Institute of Applied Mineralogy (known today as the All-Union Institute of Mineral Raw Materials), where he would conduct most of his petrochemical research.

In 1935, without defending his thesis, Alimarin received the degree of Candidate of Chemical Sciences and the title of Senior Researcher. At the same time, he took up employment at the Moscow Institute of Fine Chemical Technology (MITHT), where he worked as an assistant (1929–1935) and later as a laboratory head and associate professor (1935–1941).

When World War II began, Alimarin was evacuated along with the entire Institute of Applied Mineralogy to the Chelyabinsk region. He continued his research until his return in 1943, upon which he was appointed head of the analytical chemistry department of the MITHT. At the same time, he continued to work at the Institute of Applied Mineralogy, where he created the first inorganic microanalysis laboratory in the USSR. Alimarin also founded a school for analytical chemistry during this time.

In 1953, Alimarin was elected a corresponding member of the USSR Academy of Sciences. He acquired full membership in 1966.

From 1953 onward, Alimarin worked as the head of the analytical chemistry department at MSU's faculty of chemistry, succeeding Professor Evgenii Przhevalsky. Alimarin and his students continued to develop the field of analytical chemistry.

== Scientific activity ==
=== Developments in theoretical analytical chemistry ===
Alimarin was interested in the theoretical problems of analytical chemistry, including the composition and structure of organometallic compounds and the theoretical bases of chelate extraction and distribution chromatography. Many of the methods Alimarin developed are still employed today, both in laboratory and industrial settings.

=== Methods for determining trace elements in raw minerals ===
At the beginning of his scientific career, Alimarin carried out a series of studies on methods for determining the presence of trace boron and fluorine in minerals, since at the time there existed no efficient methods that accomplished this. In 1929, Alimarin proposed a colorimetric method for determining the presence of trace fluorine in minerals based on its capacity to form a stable zirconium-fluorine complex from zirconium-oxy-anthraquinone. He also developed efficient methods for the titrimetric determination of boron in various minerals. Alimarin also developed similar methods for niobium, tantalum, titanium, zirconium, scandium, gallium, and indium.

=== Developments in microanalysis ===
Alimarin developed microanalytic methods for determining the presence of nitrous oxide and iron oxide in minerals and water, and of silicic acid in silicates before the war. During his time in Chelyabinsk, Alimarin developed similar methods for tin, tungsten, molybdenum, cobalt, vanadium and mercury. He also made contributions to metallurgy and created a microanalysis laboratory.

After his return from Chelyabinsk, Alimarin continued his work in microanalysis, using various methods borrowed from physical chemistry. More microanalysis laboratories were created at GEOHI and the Department of Analytical Chemistry of MSU under his direction. He also proposed coulometric microtitrations and introduced the study of ion-selective electrodes for determining the presence of trace elements in small-volume solutions. He also worked on the development of electron microscopy in cooperation with the Institute of Technical Physics of the Hungarian Academy of Sciences. Among the results of this collaboration was the development of a quantitative method for the X-ray spectral microanalysis of thin layers (of up to 100 nm) in a transmission electron microscope, which allowed for determining the chemical composition of microscopic objects without their destruction with an absolute detection limit of up to 10^{−18} g.

=== Analysis of highly pure substances ===
A significant part of Alimarin's scientific activity was focused on developing methods for separating and determining the concentration of small and ultra-small concentrations of elements, i.e. "trace" analytical chemistry. An important application of these studies is analyzing the purity of substances used in nuclear power plants, semiconductors, radio electronics and optical fibres. Alimarin's teams at GEOHI and MSU created methods for the analysis of high-purity substances, which allowed them to find a large number of impurities with detection limits of 10^{−5}-10^{−9}%. These methods involved activation analysis, inversion voltammetry, luminescence, laser spectroscopy, catalytic reactions, extraction chromatography, co-deposition with atomic emission, atomic absorption, spectrophotometric determination, as well as certain combined methods.

These methods represented an important advance in quality control and remain relevant in the science of obtaining the pure substances themselves. In 1972, Alimarin was awarded the USSR State Prize for his work in this field.

=== Nuclear chemistry and radio analysis ===
Alimarin began working on nuclear chemistry in 1950. His studies served as seminal papers on the development of radioanalytical methods for determining the presence of trace elements, such as activation analysis, isotope dilution and radiometric titration.

=== Chromatography and electrochemistry ===
Alimarin carried out numerous ionic, gas-liquid and liquid-liquid chromatography studies at MSU to identify patterns of ion sorption on surface-modifiedsorbents. Based on these studies, new chromatographic methods were developed for separating several elements and many accompanying ion exchangers modified with organic reagents (heterocyclic azo compounds). Effective sorption-photometric methods were developed for the concentration and determination of palladium, copper and some other elements. Under the leadership of Alimarin, MSU and GEOHI developed a method for the determination of ultra-low concentrations of substances in 1960. This method is known today as inversion voltammetry. Alimarin also developed an oscillographic version of inversion polarography, which was 2-3 times more effective than the standard method of his time. Alimarin was also involved in the development of potentiometry and coulometry methods at MSU. At GEOHI, Alimarin developed controlled potential coulometry for determining the presence of trace platinum.

=== Luminescence analysis ===
Alimarin began research on photoluminescence in 1963 at MSU. He developed highly sensitive (detection limit 10^{−4}-10^{−7}%) methods for determining the presence of gallium, indium, tantalum, tellurium, uranium, thorium and other elements in semiconductor materials, ores, waters, and chemical reagents. In the following years, Alimarin studied low-temperature luminescence (cryo-luminescence) in aqueous solutions and extracts of halide complexes of transition metals. His methods are sometimes used to analyze the composition of semiconductor materials in electronics.

=== Contributions to the history of science ===
Alimarin's works on the history of Russian science emphasized the importance of Mikhail Lomonosov and Dmitri Mendeleev's studies. Alimarin also considered the study of platinum and the platinum group to be important in analytical chemistry. Alimarin co-authored a 1967 paper covering the developments of Russian analytical chemistry in the first half of the 19th century. Alimarin also advocated for the development of analytical chemistry and believed it to be a promising field of study.

Alimarin presented his views on the general issues of analytical chemistry, such as its name and its importance, in a 1983 article titled "Modern Understanding of the Science of analytical chemistry".

== Pedagogy ==
Alimarin held various teaching positions throughout his career. His lectures at the MITHT and later at the MSU focused on the practical aspects of analytical chemistry. Alimarin taught a general analytical chemistry course for second-year students at the Faculty of Chemistry at MSU and a special course on modern methods for students specializing in analytical chemistry. Over 80 doctorate theses were completed with Alimarin's guidance. Another 18 doctoral theses were defended with his advisory participation.

Aliman also co-authored a textbook on analytical chemistry.

== Legacy ==
The Department of Analytical Chemistry at MITHT is named after him.

== Literature ==
- "Alimarin I. P., To the sixtieth anniversary of his birth". Zavodskaya Lavoratoriya. 29 (9). 1963.
- Zolotov, Y.A.; Petrikova, M.N., eds. (1974). Advances in analytical chemistry. Moscow: Nauka. p. 358.
- Sherbina, E. (1978). "For the glory of science. Jubilee of a scientist". Moscow University. No. 38.
- Ivan Pavlovich Alimarin. Essays. Memories. Materials. Moscow: Nauka. 1993. p. 158. ISBN 5-02-001636-5.
- Ivanov, V.M.; Kolotov, V.P.; Ostroumov, G.V. (2003). "Academician Ivan Pavlovich Alimarin (1903-1989): On the 100th anniversary of his birth". Zavodskaya Laboratoriya. Diagnostika Materialov. 69 (8): 7–13. ISSN 1028-6861.
- "Ivan Pavlovich Alimarin (On the 100th anniversary of his birth)". Moscow University. No. 29. 2003.
- Mavrina, T.V.; Popov, V.A. (2003). Plate, N.A. (ed.). Russian science in persons. Moscow: Academia. p. 3. ISBN 5-87444-208-1.
- Bogunenko, N.N.; Pelipenko, A.D.; Sosnin, G.A.; Belov, A.S. (2005). Heroes of the atomic project. Sarov: Rosatom. p. 43. ISBN 5-9515-0005-2.
- Prohorov, A.M., ed. (1969–1978). Alimarin Ivan Pavlovich // Great Soviet Encyclopedia. Moscow: Sovetskaya Enciclopediya.
