= Austin L. Wahrhaftig =

- Born: May 5, 1917; Sacramento, California
- Died: November 11, 1997 (aged 80); Salt Lake City, Utah
- Education: University of California, Berkeley
- Scientific career
- Fields: Physical chemistry
- Workplaces: University of Utah
- Doctoral advisor: Richard M. Badger
- Other academic advisors: Joel Henry Hildebrand

Austin Levy Wahrhaftig (May 5, 1917 – November 11, 1997) was an American chemist and mass spectrometrist known for his development of the quasi-equilibrium theory of fragmentation of molecular ions. The Wahrhaftig diagram that illustrates the relationship between internal energy and unimolecular ion decomposition is named after him.

== Early life and education ==
Wahrhaftig was born in Sacramento, California, where he attended grade school, high school, and two years at Sacramento Junior College. He attended the University of California, Berkeley where he did undergraduate research with Joel Hildebrand and received an A.B. in chemistry in 1938.

He went to graduate school at the California Institute of Technology where he worked under Richard M. Badger and Verner Schomaker . He received his Ph.D. in 1941. He was a research fellow at Caltech from 1941 to 1945.

He then worked at the Wright Air Development Center in Pasadena, California, and as a University Fellow at the Ohio State University with Herrick L. Johnston.

== Academic career ==
Wahrhaftig joined the faculty at the Chemistry Department at the University of Utah in 1947 where he rose through the ranks and spent the rest of his career. He retired to become an emeritus professor in 1987.
