= Abraham Badu-Tawiah =

Ghanaian scientist

Abraham Kwame Badu-Tawiah
- Education: Kwame Nkrumah University of Science and Technology; Indiana University of Pennsylvania; Purdue University
- Scientific career
- Workplaces: Ohio State University
- Thesis: Adsorption isotherms of diamond-packed columns in reverse phase liquid chromatography (2010)
- Doctoral advisor: R. Graham Cooks
- Other academic advisors: George M. Whitesides

Abraham Badu-Tawiah is a Ghanaian scientist who is a professor of chemistry at the Ohio State University. His research considers the development of mass spectrometry for the detection of disease. In 2017 he was awarded the American Chemical Society Arthur F. Findeis prize and in 2020 a Sloan Research Fellowship.

== Early life and education ==
Badu-Tawiah is from rural Ghana. He was one of three graduates of a high school class of 500 that went on to attend university. He earned his bachelor's and master's degree at the Kwame Nkrumah University of Science and Technology. In 2005 he moved to the United States, where he joined the laboratory of R. Graham Cooks at Purdue University to study high-performance liquid chromatography. There he studied reactions in mass spectrometers, and started to investigate whether this unique environment could be used for synthesis. Whilst at Purdue, Badu-Tawiah was awarded several research fellowships, including the Andrews and Lilly Innovation Fellowships. In 2012 Badu-Tawiah joined Harvard University where he worked in the research laboratory of George M. Whitesides. There he developed paper-based systems capable of performing molecular recognition. In particular, Badu-Tawiah looked to develop macrofluidic platforms that could analyse for specific biomarkers. Unfortunately, the enzymes required to detect biomarkers on paper-based platforms are not stable and require careful storage.

== Research and career ==
Badu-Tawiah was appointed assistant professor at the Ohio State University in 2014. His research considers new mass spectrometry techniques for the detection of disease. Mass spectrometry offers several advantages over macrofluidic platforms, as they remain stable. To achieve this he makes use of cleavable ionic probes that can be used to perform immunoassays. These probes can be attached to antibodies and mounted to a flexible substrate for screening without refrigeration. He made use of wax ink to trace out the outline of the channels of the device, forming a waterproof barrier that separates that safely captures and stores the blood sample. Badu-Tawiah has worked on devices that can allow the early-detection of malaria and Zika virus. In 2016 he demonstrated that these simple diagnostic tests were able to accurately diagnose whether someone was infected with malaria up to one month after blood was collected, and that patients could send them by mail to research labs. Alongside malaria diagnosis, the tests are capable of identifying the cancer antigens that are markers for cancers of the large intestine.

Alongside disease detection, Badu-Tawiah works on novel analytical devices for photo- and electro-catalytic screening.

== Awards and honours ==
- 2016 United States Department of Energy Early Career Award
- 2017 American Society for Mass Spectrometry Research Award
- 2017 Eli Lilly Young Investigator Award in Analytical Chemistry
- 2017 American Chemical Society Arthur F. Findeis Award
- 2018 American Society for Mass Spectrometry Faces of Mass Spectrometry
- 2020 Sloan Research Fellowship

== Select publications ==
- Müller, Thomas; Badu-Tawiah, Abraham; Cooks, R. Graham (2012). "Accelerated Carbon-Carbon Bond-Forming Reactions in Preparative Electrospray". Angewandte Chemie International Edition. 51 (47): 11832–11835. doi:10.1002/anie.201206632. ISSN 1521-3773. PMID 23042619.
- Badu-Tawiah, Abraham K.; Eberlin, Livia S.; Ouyang, Zheng; Cooks, R. Graham (2016). "Faculty Opinions recommendation of Chemical aspects of the extractive methods of ambient ionization mass spectrometry". Annual Review of Physical Chemistry. 64: 481–505. doi:10.1146/annurev-physchem-040412-110026. PMID 23331308.
- Damon, Deidre E.; Davis, Kathryn M.; Moreira, Camila R.; Capone, Patricia; Cruttenden, Riley; Badu-Tawiah, Abraham K. (10 February 2016). "Direct Biofluid Analysis Using Hydrophobic Paper Spray Mass Spectrometry". Analytical Chemistry. 88 (3): 1878–1884. doi:10.1021/acs.analchem.5b04278.s001. PMID 26730614.
