= Glow-discharge optical emission spectroscopy =

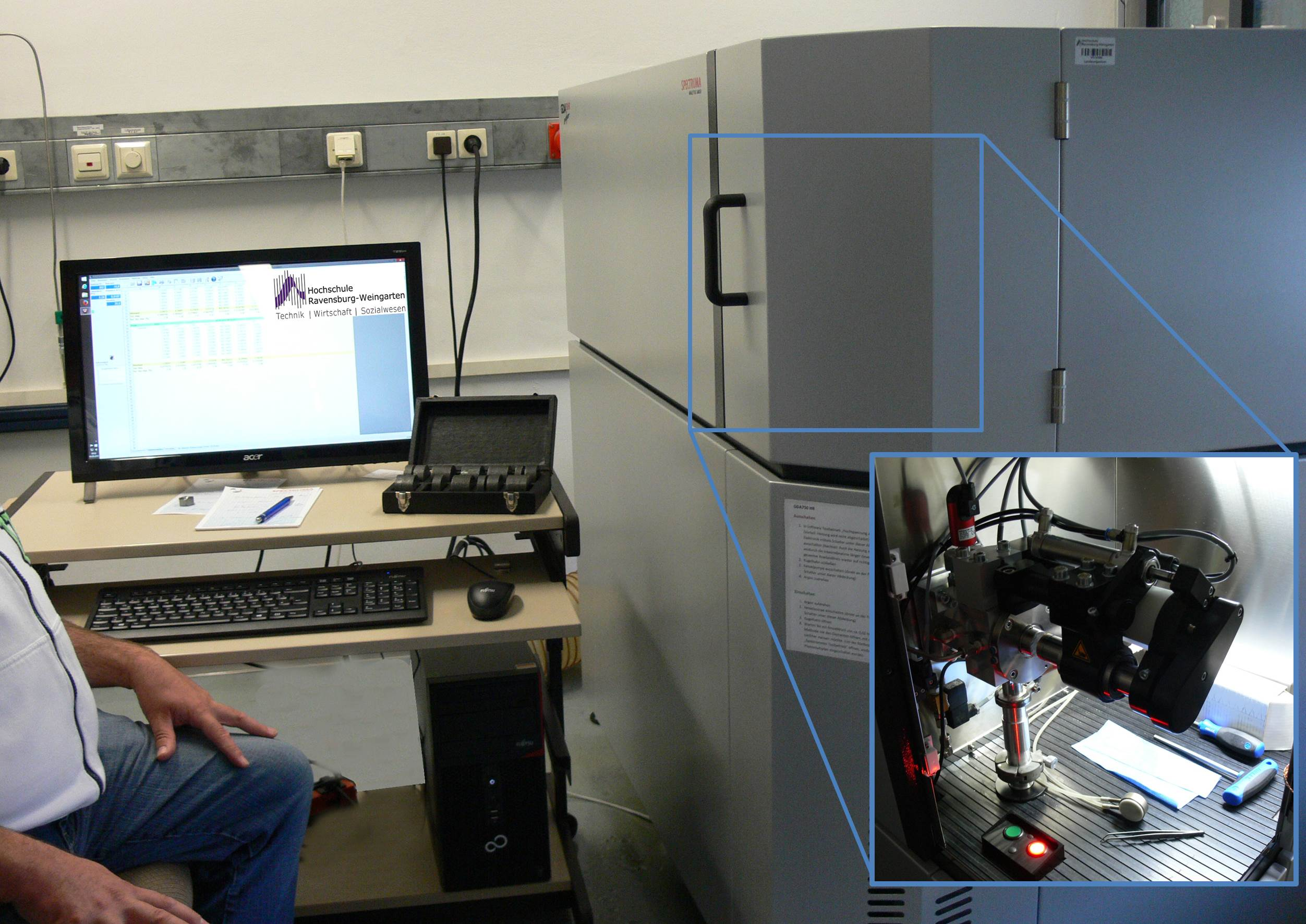
GDOES at the University of Applied Sciences Ravensburg-Weingarten

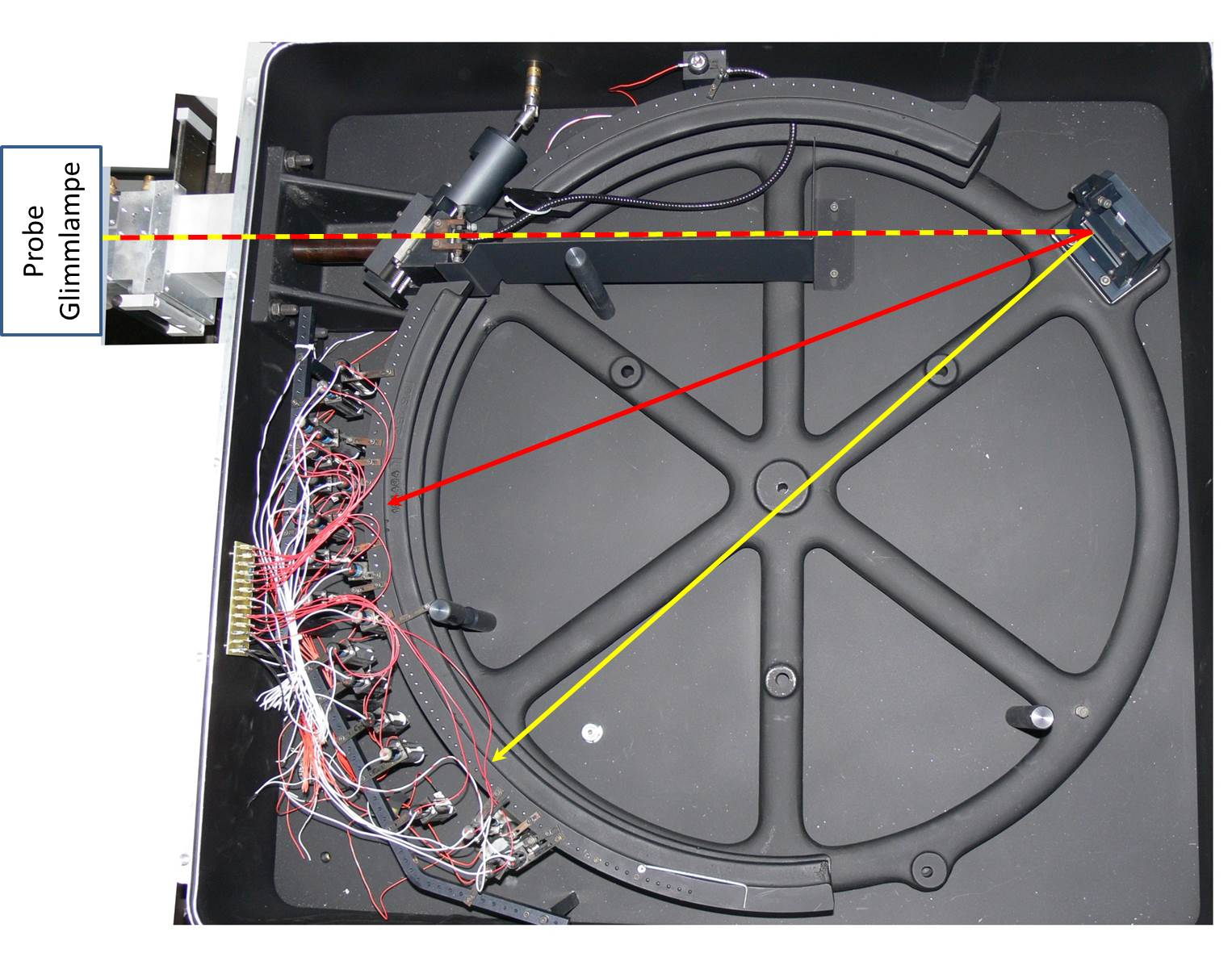
Upper left: Glow discharge source; Right: Rowland circle in a photo-spectrometer

Glow-discharge optical emission spectroscopy (GDOES) is a spectroscopic method for the quantitative analysis of metals and other non-metallic solids. The idea was published and patented in 1968 by Werner Grimm from Hanau, Germany.

Ordinary atomic spectroscopy can be used to determine the surface of a material, but not its layered structure. In contrast, GDOES gradually ablates the layers of the sample, revealing the deeper structure.

GDOES spectroscopy can be used for the quantitative and qualitative determination of elements and is therefore a method of analytical chemistry.

== Process ==
The metallic samples are used as a cathode in a direct current plasma. From the surface, the sample is removed in layers by sputtering with argon ions. The removed atoms pass into the plasma by diffusion. Photons are emitted with excited waves and have characteristic wavelengths which are recorded by means of a downstream spectrometer and subsequently quantified.

When using a high-frequency alternating voltage for plasma generation and the corresponding construction of the glow discharge source, non-metallic samples can also be examined.

Various instruments are used as sensors. Photomultipliers can detect the slightest traces and also high concentrations of the sensor-specific element. By means of charge-coupled device, a complete element spectrum can be measured with the appropriate layer thickness.

== Applications ==
Glow discharge spectroscopy is an established method for the characterization of steels and varnishes. Recent developments relate to the analysis of porous electrodes from lithium-ion batteries.
