= Cold vapour atomic fluorescence spectroscopy =

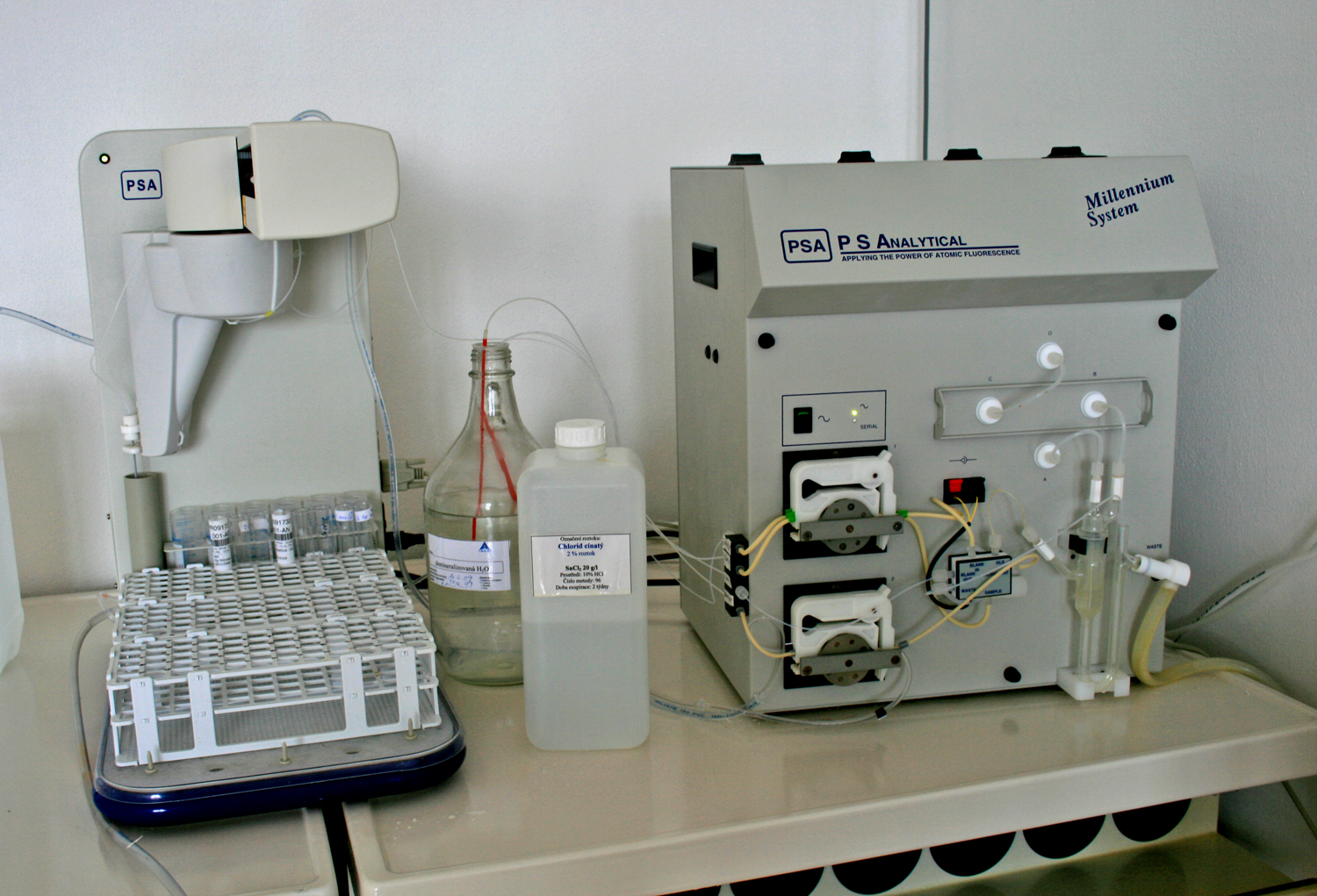
Vapour atomic fluorescence analyzer

Cold vapour atomic fluorescence spectroscopy (CVAFS) is a subset of the analytical technique known as atomic fluorescence spectroscopy (AFS).

== Use for mercury detection ==
Used in the measurement of trace amounts of volatile heavy metals such as mercury, cold vapour AFS makes use of the unique characteristic of mercury that allows vapour measurement at room temperature. Free mercury atoms in a carrier gas are excited by a collimated ultraviolet light source at a wavelength of 253.7 nanometres. The excited atoms re-radiate their absorbed energy (fluoresce) at this same wavelength. Unlike the directional excitation source, the fluorescence is omnidirectional and may thus be detected using a photomultiplier tube or UV photodiode.

Gold coated traps may be used to collect mercury in ambient air or other media. The traps are then heated, releasing the mercury from the gold while passing argon through the cartridge. This preconcentrates the mercury, increasing sensitivity, and also transfers the mercury into an inert gas.

== Transportable analysers ==
A number of companies have commercialized mercury detection via CVAFS and produced transportable analysers capable of measuring mercury in ambient air. These devices can measure levels in the low parts per quadrillion range (10^{−15}).

== EPA-approved methods ==
Various analytical methods approved by the United States Environmental Protection Agency (EPA) for measuring mercury in wastewater are in common use. EPA Methods 245.7 and 1631 are commonly used for measurement of industrial wastewater using CVAFS.

== See also ==
Other analytical techniques suitable for analyzing heavy metals in air or water:

- Inductively coupled plasma mass spectrometry
- Atomic absorption spectroscopy
