= Hanns Malissa =

- Born: 8 October 1920; Bruck an der Mur
- Died: 22 June 2010 (aged 89); Bruck an der Mur
- Education: Graz University of Technology
- Awards: Fritz Pregl Prize, Robert Boyle Prize for Analytical Science
- Scientific career
- Fields: Analytical chemistry, Chemistry education
- Workplaces: Vienna University of Technology, Uppsala University, Max Planck Institute for Iron Research GmbH

Hanns Malissa (8 October 1920 – 22 June 2010) was an Austrian analytical chemist and environmental chemist who published about 250 scientific papers and several books.

== Academic career ==
Malissa completed high school in his home town Bruck an der Mur in March 1939, and studied chemistry first at the Prague University of Technology but earned his doctorate at the Graz University of Technology in December 1943. Subsequently he became an assistant at the institutes for food chemistry and geochemistry. From July 1948 to February 1949 he was a guest scientist at Uppsala University. From 1953-1959 he worked at the Max Planck Institute for Iron Research GmbH and then became a full professor for analytical chemistry at the Vienna University of Technology, a position which he would hold for the next 30 years.

== Fields of work ==
Malissa was most prolific in applying X-ray fluorescence (which he greatly advanced as an microanalytical method, under the name "electron beam analysis") to analyze samples as varied in origin as the Allende meteorite and flame retardant materials. About 10 papers which he authored or co-authored dealt with applications of dithiocarbamate reagents.

In addition Malissa published some 20 papers on systems theory and Information theory in analytical chemistry, and some 15 more on automation in organic analysis. His work on particulate matter in the atmosphere (about 30 papers) took him into the emerging field of environmental chemistry. When the first Conference on Carbonaceous Particles in the Atmosphere was held in 1978 at Berkeley, California Hanns Malissa presented the first paper titled "Some analytical approaches to the chemical characterization of carbonaceous particulates."

== International cooperations and functions ==
Hanns Malissa was a fervent proponent of chemistry education and international collaboration in analytical chemistry, two fields where he made a lasting impact at his university. In addition to his strong ties with the Western countries—particularly Germany, Switzerland, Great Britain, and the United States—he established and maintained excellent relations with the academic establishments in communist Eastern Europe, organizing visits of scientists from this region in spite of the travel restrictions during the Cold War period.

Malissa was a founding member of the European Federation of Chemical Societies (later absorbed into the European Association for Chemical and Molecular Sciences) in 1971, and chaired its Working Party on Analytical Chemistry (WPAC) for 10 years. He contributed to the work of IUPAC for 20 years, including 4 years as President of the Division of Analytical Chemistry. The Finnish Academy of Science and Letters made him a foreign member in 1992.

== Honors ==
Among the many international honors which Malissa earned during his career were honorary memberships of the Midland Society for Analytical Chemistry (1952), the Hungarian Academy of Sciences (1988), and the chemical societies of Finland (1984) and Germany (1989).

== Late life and death ==
When Malissa retired in 1989 he returned to his hometown Bruck an der Mur, where he became an active citizen and continued to publish on the more philosophical aspects of analytical chemistry and on building a fundamental theory of the field that would reflect its dynamic evolution under new paradigms. At an age of almost 90 years he died on 22 June 2010 after a brief terminal illness.

== Sources ==
- Grasserbauer M. A Tribute to Hanns Malissa. Editorial in Microchimica Acta 119(1-2), I-II, doi:10.1007/BF01244848
- Austrian Academy of Sciences clean air commission. Curriculum vitae Hanns Malissa.
- In memoriam Hanns Malissa. Eulogy written for the 10th International Conference on Carbonaceous Particles in the Atmosphere, June 26–29, 2011. Archived
