= Marcos Nogueira Eberlin =

Brazilian chemist and creationist

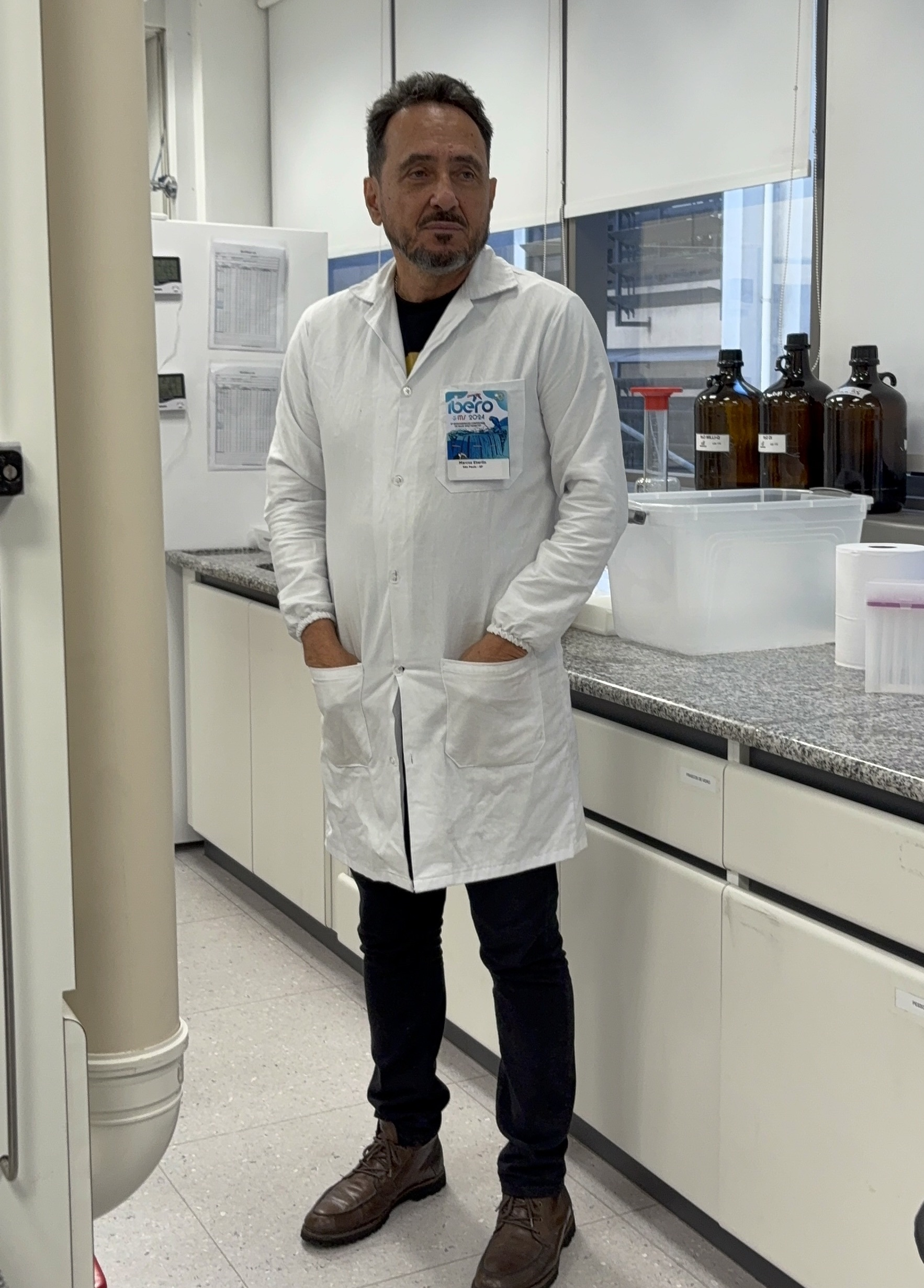
- Dr. Marcos Eberlin at the MackMass Lab, acenter for research in graphene and nanotechnologies, 2025
- Born: 4 March 1959 (age 67)
- Education: University of Campinas
- Known for: Mass Spectrometry
- Scientific career
- Fields: Chemist
- Workplaces: University of Campinas

Marcos Nogueira Eberlin (born 4 March 1959) is a Brazilian chemist and former professor at the Institute of Chemistry of the University of Campinas. He is a member of the Brazilian Academy of Sciences and received the Brazilian National Order of Scientific Merit in 2005 and the Thomson Medal in 2016.

Eberlin discovered the Eberlin reaction during his work on gas-phase ion chemistry. He and his research group introduced EASI (Easy Ambient Sonic-spray Ionization), an ionization technique used in mass spectrometry.

Eberlin is an advocate of intelligent design in Brazil, on which he also lectures and he has signed the Dissent From Darwinism statement. He is a creationist also, and has said that evolution theory is a fallacy.

His daughter, Livia S. Eberlin, is also a chemist who won the MacArthur "Genius" Fellowship in 2018 for her research on the use of mass spectrometry to diagnose cancer. Eberlin and his daughter have worked together on a different project, using mass spectrometry to detect counterfeit money.
