= Atomic spectroscopy =

Study of electromagnetic radiation absorbed/emitted by atoms

In physics, atomic spectroscopy is the study of the electromagnetic radiation absorbed and emitted by atoms. Since unique elements have unique emission spectra, atomic spectroscopy is applied for determination of elemental compositions. It can be divided by atomization source or by the type of spectroscopy used. In the latter case, the main division is between optical and mass spectrometry. Mass spectrometry generally provides significantly better analytical performance but is also significantly more complex. This complexity translates into higher purchase costs, higher operational costs, more operator training, and a greater number of components that can potentially fail. Because optical spectroscopy is often less expensive and has performance adequate for many tasks, it is far more common. Atomic absorption spectrometers are one of the most commonly sold and used analytical devices.

== Atomic spectroscopy ==
Electrons exist in energy levels (i.e. atomic orbitals) within an atom. Atomic orbitals are quantized, meaning they exist as defined values instead of being continuous (see: atomic orbitals). Electrons may move between orbitals, but in doing so they must absorb or emit energy equal to the energy difference between their atom's specific quantized orbital energy levels. In optical spectroscopy, energy absorbed to move an electron to a higher energy level (higher orbital) and/or the energy emitted as the electron moves to a lower energy level is absorbed or emitted in the form of photons (light particles). Because each element has a unique number of electrons, an atom will absorb/release energy in a pattern unique to its elemental identity (e.g. Ca, Na, etc.) and thus will absorb/emit photons in a correspondingly unique pattern. The type of atoms present in a sample, or the amount of atoms present in a sample can be deduced from measuring these changes in light wavelength and light intensity.

Atomic spectroscopy is further divided into atomic absorption spectroscopy and atomic emission spectroscopy. In atomic absorption spectroscopy, light of a predetermined wavelength is passed through a collection of atoms. If the wavelength of the source light has energy corresponding to the energy difference between two energy levels in the atoms, a portion of the light will be absorbed. The difference between the intensity of the light emitted from the source (e.g., lamp) and the light collected by the detector yields an absorbance value. This absorbance value can then be used to determine the concentration of a given element (or atoms) within the sample. The relationship between the concentration of atoms, the distance the light travels through the collection of atoms, and the portion of the light absorbed is given by the Beer–Lambert law. In atomic emission spectroscopy, the intensity of the emitted light is directly proportional to the concentration of atoms.

== Ion and atom sources ==
Sources can be adapted in many ways, but the lists below give the general uses of a number of sources. Of these, flames are the most common due to their low cost and their simplicity. Although significantly less common, inductively-coupled plasmas, especially when used with mass spectrometers, are recognized for their outstanding analytical performance and their versatility.

For all atomic spectroscopy, a sample must be vaporized and atomized. For atomic mass spectrometry, a sample must also be ionized. Vaporization, atomization, and ionization are often, but not always, accomplished with a single source. Alternatively, one source may be used to vaporize a sample while another is used to atomize (and possibly ionize). An example of this is laser ablation inductively-coupled plasma atomic emission spectrometry, where a laser is used to vaporize a solid sample and an inductively-coupled plasma is used to atomize the vapor.

With the exception of flames and graphite furnaces, which are most commonly used for atomic absorption spectroscopy, most sources are used for atomic emission spectroscopy.

Liquid-sampling sources include flames and sparks (atom source), inductively-coupled plasma (atom and ion source), graphite furnace (atom source), microwave plasma (atom and ion source), and direct-current plasma (atom and ion source). Solid-sampling sources include lasers (atom and vapor source), glow discharge (atom and ion source), arc (atom and ion source), spark (atom and ion source), and graphite furnace (atom and vapor source). Gas-sampling sources include flame (atom source), inductively-coupled plasma (atom and ion source), microwave plasma (atom and ion source), direct-current plasma (atom and ion source), and glow discharge (atom and ion source).

== Selection rules ==
For any given atom, there are quantum numbers that can specify the wavefunction of that atom. Using the hydrogen atom as an example, four quantum numbers are required to fully describe the state of the system. Quantum numbers that are eigenvalues of the operators that commute with the wavefunction to describe physical aspects of the system, and are called “good” numbers because of this. Once good quantum numbers have been found for a given atomic transition, the selection rules determine what changes in quantum numbers are allowed.

The electric dipole (E1) transition of a hydrogen atom can be described with the quantum numbers l (orbital angular momentum quantum number), m_{l} (magnetic quantum number), m_{s} (electron spin quantum number), and n (principal quantum number). When evaluating the effect of the electric dipole moment operator μ on the wavefunction of the system, we see that all values of the eigenvalue are 0, except for when the changes in the quantum numbers follow a specific pattern.

$$\langle \Psi_{nlm_lm_s} | \mu| \Psi_{n'l'm_l'm_s'}\rangle$$

For example in the E1 transition, unless Δ l = ± 1, Δ m_{l} = 0 or ± 1, Δ m_{s} = 0, and Δ n = any integer, the equation above will yield a value equal to zero and the transition would be known as a “forbidden transition”. For example, this would occur for certain cases like when Δ l = 2. In this case, the transition would not be allowed and therefore would be much weaker than an allowed transition. These specific values for the changes in quantum numbers are known as the selection rules for the allowed transitions and are shown for common transitions in the table below:

Allowed Transition Moments
| Nonzero Electric Dipole | E1 | Δ l = ± 1 | Δ m_{l} = 0, ± 1 | Δ m_{s} = 0 | Δ n = any integer |
| Electric Quadrupole | E2 | Δ l = 0, ± 2 | Δ m_{l} = 0, ± 1, ± 2 | Δ m_{s} = 0 | Δ n = any integer |
| Magnetic Dipole | M1 | Δ l = 0 | Δ m_{l} = 0, ± 1 | Δ m_{s} = 0 | Δ n = 0 |

== See also ==
- Cold vapour atomic fluorescence spectroscopy
- Atomic spectral line
