= Gary Glish =

American analytical chemist

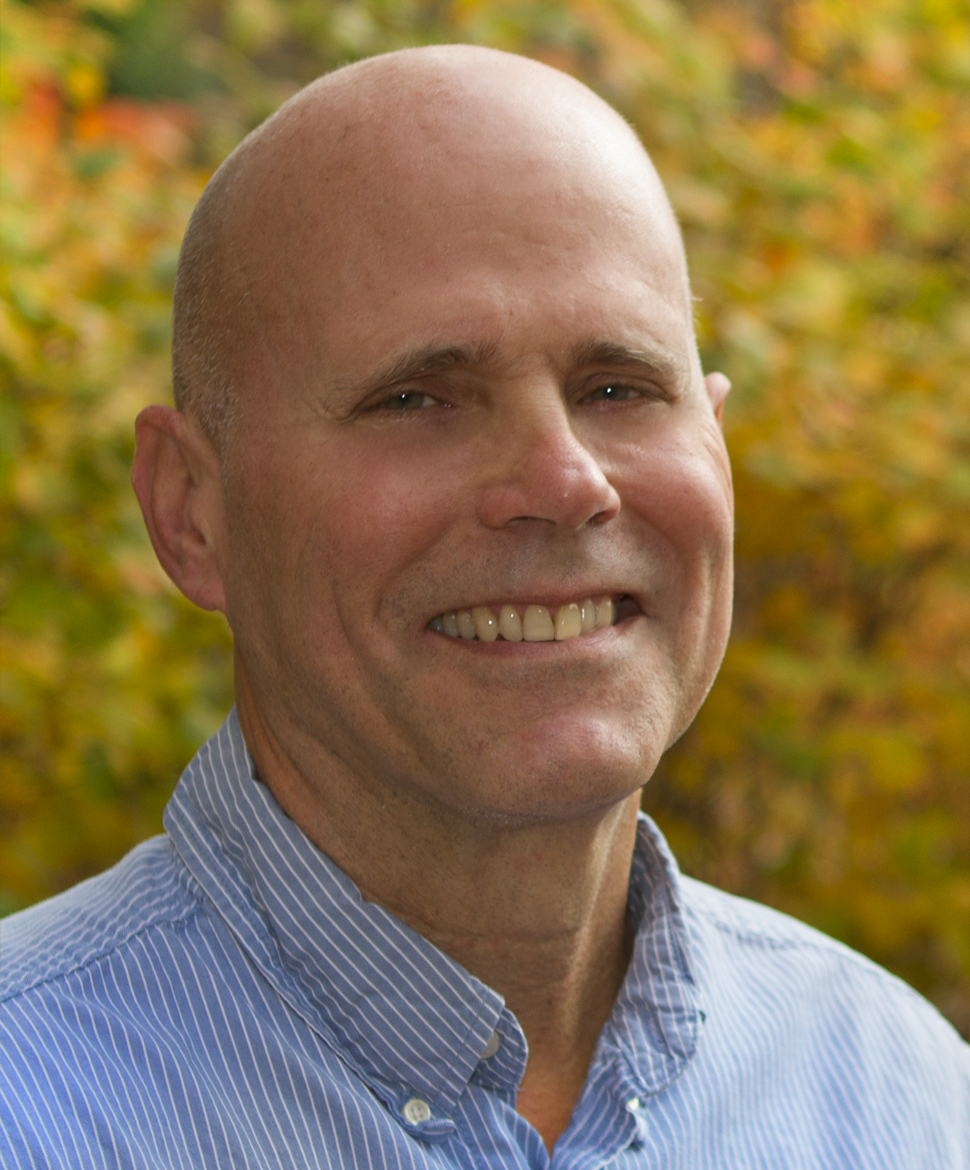
- Born: August 23, 1954 (age 72); Bay City, Michigan
- Education: Wabash College (B.A.) (1976) Purdue University (Ph.D.) (1980)
- Scientific career
- Fields: Chemistry
- Workplaces: University of North Carolina at Chapel Hill
- Doctoral advisor: Graham Cooks

Gary Glish (born August 23, 1954) is an American analytical chemist at the University of North Carolina at Chapel Hill. He is a leading researcher in the fields of mass spectrometry, ion chemistry, and biomolecule analysis.

== Background ==
Gary L. Glish was born on August 23, 1954, in Bay City, Michigan, and grew up in Kalamazoo, Michigan. He received a B.A. in chemistry and a B.A. in economics from Wabash in 1976. He accomplished his Ph.D. in chemistry at Purdue University in 1980. Upon graduating, Glish decided to start a career in analytical chemistry, working with the new technologies afforded by computers to create analytical instrumentation.

Glish designed and built the first ever quadrupole/time of flight (Q/TOF) mass spectrometer and has contributed extensively to the development of the quadrupole ion trap mass spectrometer, including the first interfacing of electrospray ionization and MALDI.

== Career ==
After graduating from Purdue, Glish worked at Oak Ridge National Laboratory as Research Staff and Group Leader from 1980 to 1992. He also served on the Board of Directors for the Asilomar Conference on Mass Spectrometry from 1987 to 1989. He has a long history with the American Society for Mass Spectrometry from 1987 to 2010, first serving as Vice President for Arrangements, then Associate Editor for the Journal of the American Society for Mass Spectrometry, Vice President for Programs, and ultimately President.

Glish started teaching at the University of North Carolina at Chapel Hill in the Department of Chemistry in 1992. He currently leads the Glish Group in research focusing on mass spectrometry analytical methods.

== Research ==
Research by the Glish Group focuses on development and applications of mass spectrometry analytical instrumentation. One of the most prominent technologies used by Glish is differential ion mobility spectrometry, or DIMS. This separation method relies on the differing mobilities of ions in electric fields of varying strengths. DIMS/MS is used by the Glish Group to analyze lipids, leukemia antigen peptides, and aerosol compounds found in e-cigarettes.

== Patents ==
- U.S. Patent No. 4,849,628, Atmospheric Sampling Glow Discharge Ionization Source
- U.S. Patent No. 5,206,509, Universal Collisional Activation Ion Trap Mass Spectrometry
- U.S. Patent No. 6,703,611, Electrospray Ionization Device
- U.S. Patent No. 7,227,133, Methods and Apparatus for Electron or Positron Capture Dissociation
- U.S. Patent No. 7,514,674, Octapole Ion Trap Mass Spectrometers and Related Methods
