= Sophia Eberlein =

American murder victim (1889–1931)

- Born: 1889; Russian Empire
- Died: October 2, 1931; Harvey, North Dakota
- Spouses: Hugo Eberlein; Jacob Bentz
- Children: Two daughters

Sophia Eberlein, (1889–October 2, 1931), was a German from Russia emigrant beaten to death by her second husband Jacob Bentz in her home in Harvey, North Dakota. According to author William Jackson, the ghost of Sophie might be haunting a library built on this location.

== Murder ==
Sophia Eberlein was born in the Russian Empire and emigrated to the United States. She married Hugo Eberlein, a well-known Harvey businessman, and had two daughters, Lillian and Alice. After Hugo's death in 1928, Sophia married Bentz. During the night, after 1am, on Friday, October 2, 1931, Bentz bludgeoned Sophia to death while she slept. He did his best to clean up the scene of the crime and tried to make Sophie's death look like a car accident. However, when Sophia's daughter Lillian came home for the funeral, she found blood in the house and reported her findings to the police. Bentz admitted the crime during the investigation and was sentenced to life in prison. He died in 1944 in the state penitentiary.

In 1990 a new library was built on the site of the former Eberlein house. According to author William Jackson, the librarian's office is built directly over the site where Eberlein's bedroom was and librarians report cold chills and other oddities.
