= Chorlton =

Chorlton may refer to:

== Places ==
- Chorlton, Cheshire East, in Cheshire, England
- Chorlton, Cheshire West and Chester, in Cheshire, England
- Chorlton-cum-Hardy, in Manchester, England
  - Chorlton (ward), an electoral ward of Manchester, England
  - Chorlton Park (ward), an area and electoral ward of Manchester, England
- Chorlton-on-Medlock, in Manchester, England
- Chapel and Hill Chorlton, in Staffordshire, England

== People with the surname ==
- Harold Chorlton (1898–1967), British trade unionist and politician
- Michael C. Chorlton (1913–1951), English film editor and director
- Tom Chorlton (1880–1948), English footballer who played for Liverpool F.C.

== Fictional characters ==
- The protagonist of Chorlton and the Wheelies, a British children's animated television series
