= Direct-current plasma =

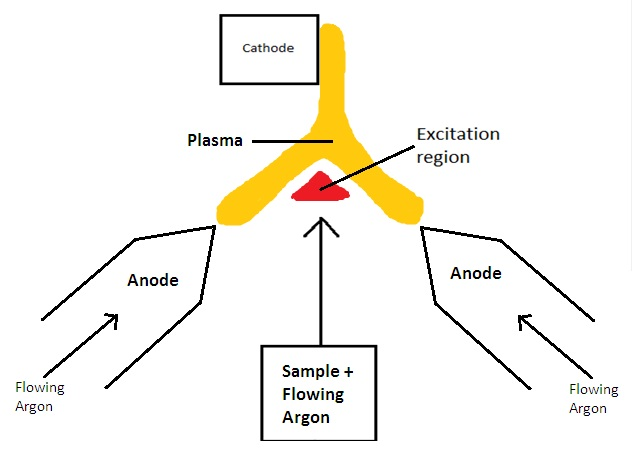
Figure 1: Schematic of a three-electrode, argon DCP source. Note the inverted-'Y' shape of the plasma column.

Direct-current plasma (DCP) is a type of plasma source used for atomic emission spectroscopy that utilizes three electrodes to produce a plasma stream. The most common three-electrode DCP apparatus consists of two graphite anode blocks and a tungsten cathode block arranged in an inverted-Y arrangement. An argon gas source is situated between the anode blocks and argon gas flows through the anode blocks. The plasma stream is produced by briefly contacting the cathode with the anodes. Temperatures at the arc core exceed 8000 K. This three-electrode arrangement is illustrated in Figure 1.

== Applications ==
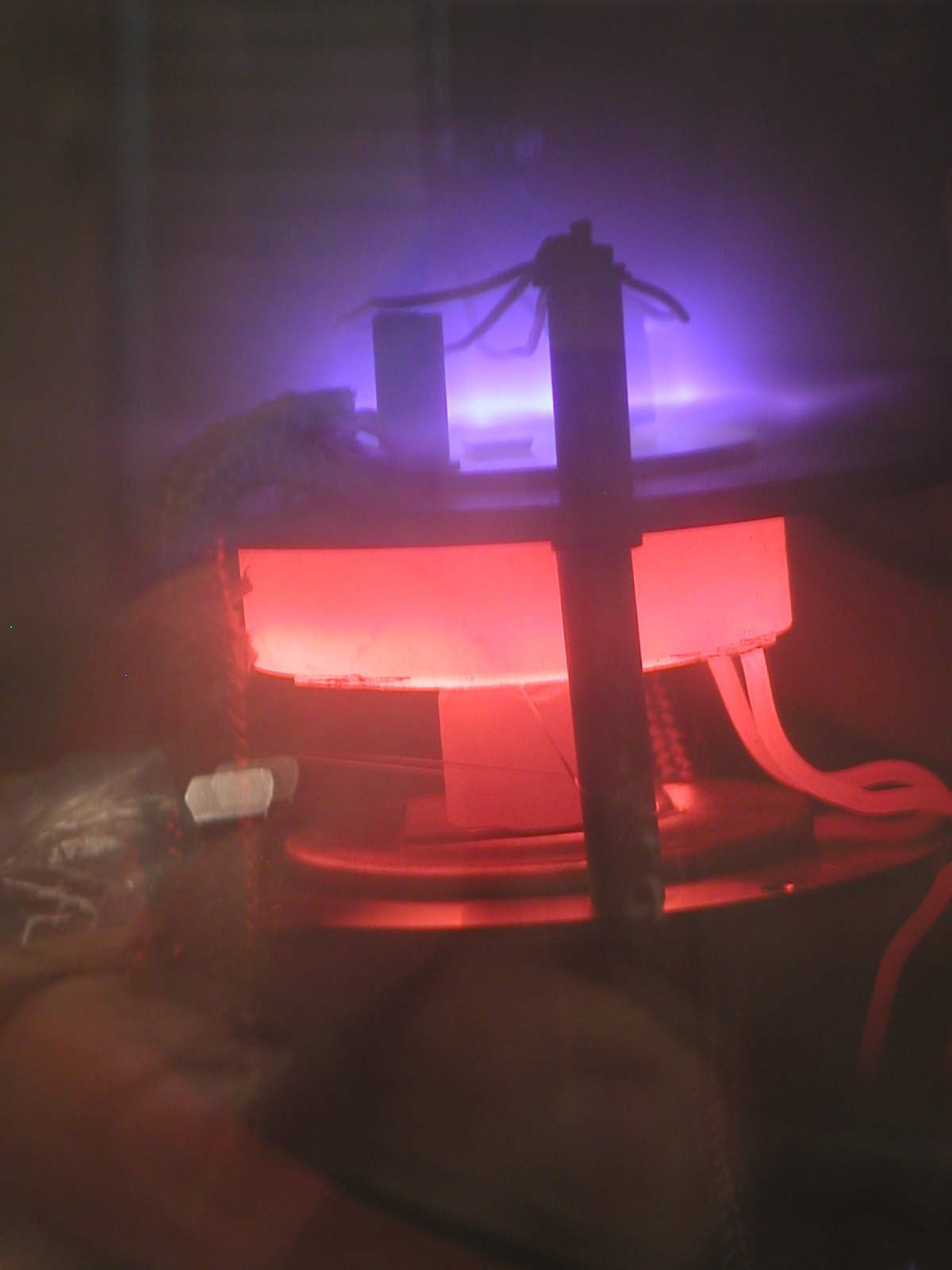
Figure 2: A chemical vapor deposition chamber in which DCP (giving off the violet light) is being used to assist in the growth of carbon nanotubes.

The applications of DCP are comparable to inductively coupled plasma (ICP). Some applications include, but are not limited to:

- identification of boron in tissues and cells
- analysis of trace metals in cows
- synthesis of carbon nanofibers

Figure 2 shows DCP being used to grow carbon nanofibers.

== Comparison to inductively coupled plasma (ICP) ==
DCP incurs several key disadvantages in comparison to ICP. In addition to the lower sensitivity, spectra generated by DCP generally present fewer spectral lines. DCP samples are often incompletely volatilized due to the relatively short amount of time spent in the hottest region of the plasma. Furthermore, DCP requires more regular upkeep than ICP, because the graphite electrodes wear out after a few hours and must be exchanged

However, DCP is not without a few advantages over ICP. The amount of argon needed for DCP is much less than that needed for ICP. Also, DCP can analyze samples that have a higher percentage of solid in solution than can be handled by ICP.
