= Gerald L. Eberlein =

German sociology educator

Gerald L. Eberlein (5 May 1930 – 12 August 2010) was a German sociology educator.

== Biography ==
Eberlein was born in Berlin, Germany to Kurt Karl and Alice Caroline (b. Seiffermann) Eberlein. Gerald L. Eberlein became Ph.D. at the Technische Hochschule Stuttgart, Germany, in 1962. He was assistant professor at the University of Münster and at the Free University of Berlin, Germany, 1963–1970. Between 1971 and 1972 he was visiting professor at the Technische Universität Berlin. 1972-1975 he was associate professor of philosophy of the social sciences, economy and politics at the University of the Saarland, Germany. Eberlein was professor of sociology at the Technical University of Munich, Germany, 1975–1998. In 1998 he became professor emeritus.

Gerald L. Eberlein has one child, Viviane Caroline. He was living in Pöcking, Germany at the time of his death.

== Works ==
- Der Erfahrungsbegriff der heutigen empirischen Sozialforschung, 1963
- Theoretische Soziologie heute (with N. Dietrich), 1971
- Die Finalisierung der Wissenschaften, 1983
- Maximierung der Erkenntnisse ohne sozialen Sinn? Für eine wertbewusste Wissenschaft, 1987
- Schulwissenschaft, Parawissenschaft, Pseudowissenschaft, Stuttgart 1991

== Editor ==
- Kleines Lexikon der Parawissenschaften, 1995
- Theory and Decision: An International Journal for Philosophy and Methodology of the Social Sciences, 1970–2001
- Theory and Decision Library: An International Series in Philosophy and Methodology of the Social and Behavioral Sciences, 1974–1998

== Member ==
- Society for Scientific Exploration
- Prof. Eberlein was a member of the scientific advisory board of the Nicolas-Benzin-Stiftung
