= Gas-phase ion chemistry =

Field of science

Gas phase ion chemistry is a field of science encompassed within both chemistry and physics. It is the science that studies ions and molecules in the gas phase, most often enabled by some form of mass spectrometry. By far the most important applications for this science is in studying the thermodynamics and kinetics of reactions. For example, one application is in studying the thermodynamics of the solvation of ions. Ions with small solvation spheres of 1, 2, 3... solvent molecules can be studied in the gas phase and then extrapolated to bulk solution.

== Theory ==
=== Transition state theory ===
Transition state theory is the theory of the rates of elementary reactions which assumes a special type of chemical equilibrium (quasi-equilibrium) between reactants and activated complexes.

=== RRKM theory ===
RRKM theory is used to compute simple estimates of the unimolecular ion decomposition reaction rates from a few characteristics of the potential energy surface.

== Gas phase ion formation ==
The process of converting an atom or molecule into an ion by adding or removing charged particles such as electrons or other ions can occur in the gas phase. These processes are an important component of gas phase ion chemistry.

=== Associative ionization ===
Associative ionization is a gas phase reaction in which two atoms or molecules interact to form a single product ion.

$$A^* + B \to AB^{+\bullet} + e^-$$

where species A with excess internal energy (indicated by the asterisk) interacts with B to form the ion AB^{+}.

One or both of the interacting species may have excess internal energy.

=== Charge-exchange ionization ===
Charge-exchange ionization (also called charge-transfer ionization) is a gas phase reaction between an ion and a neutral species

$$A^+ + B \to A + B^+$$

in which the charge of the ion is transferred to the neutral.

=== Chemical ionization ===
In chemical ionization, ions are produced through the reaction of ions of a reagent gas with other species. Some common reagent gases include: methane, ammonia, and isobutane.

=== Chemi-ionization ===
Chemi-ionization can be represented by

$$G^* + M \to M^{+\bullet} + e^- + G$$

where G is the excited state species (indicated by the superscripted asterisk), and M is the species that is ionized by the loss of an electron to form the radical cation (indicated by the superscripted "plus-dot").

=== Penning ionization ===
Penning ionization refers to the interaction between a gas-phase excited-state atom or molecule G^{*} and a target molecule M resulting in the formation of a radical molecular cation M^{+.}, an electron e^{−}, and a neutral gas molecule G:

$$G^* + M \to M^{+\bullet} + e^- + G$$

Penning ionization occurs when the target molecule has an ionization potential lower than the internal energy of the excited-state atom or molecule. Associative Penning ionization can also occur:

$$G^* + M \to MG^{+\bullet} + e^-$$

== Fragmentation ==
There are many important dissociation reactions that take place in the gas phase.

=== Collision-induced dissociation ===
CID (also called collisionally activated dissociation - CAD) is a method used to fragment molecular ions in the gas phase. The molecular ions collide with neutral gas molecules such as helium, nitrogen, or argon. In the collision some of the kinetic energy is converted into internal energy which results in fragmentation.

=== Charge remote fragmentation ===
Charge remote fragmentation is a type of covalent bond breaking that occurs in a gas phase ion in which the cleaved bond is not adjacent to the location of the charge.

== Charge transfer reactions ==
There are several types of charge-transfer reactions (also known as charge-permutation reactions): partial-charge transfer

$$A^{2+} + B \to A^+ + B^+$$,

charge-stripping reaction

$$A^+ + B \to A^{2+} + B + e^-$$,

and charge-inversion reaction positive to negative

$$A^+ + B \to A^- + B^{2+}$$

and negative to positive

$$A^- + B \to A^+ + B + 2e^-$$.

== Applications ==
Pairwise interactions between alkali metal ions and amino acids, small peptides and nucleobases have been studied theoretically in some detail.

== See also ==
- Adiabatic ionization
- Mass-analyzed ion kinetic energy spectrometry
- Plasma (physics)
- Michael T. Bowers
- R. Graham Cooks
- Helmut Schwarz

== Bibliography ==
- Fundamentals of gas phase ion chemistry, Keith R. Jennings (ed.), Dordrecht, Boston, Kluwer Academic, 1991, pp. 226–8
- Gas Phase Ion Chemistry, Michael T. Bowers, ed., Academic Press, New York, 1979
- Gas Phase Ion Chemistry Vol 2.; Bowers, M.T., Ed.; Academic Press: New York, 1979
- Gas Phase Ion Chemistry Vol 3., Michael T. Bowers, ed., Academic Press, New York, 1983
