= Peter Sykes (chemist) =

British chemist

Peter Sykes, FRSC (19 February 1923 – 24 October 2003) was a British chemist and a former fellow and vice-master of Christ's College, Cambridge.

He is the author of the undergraduate-level organic chemistry textbook A Guidebook to Mechanism in Organic Chemistry. A textbook on mechanistic organic chemistry, it is used all over the world for different competitive examinations.

He was born in Chorlton, the younger son of John George Sykes and Alice (née Booth). He attended Rydal School.

Peter Sykes married Joyce Tyler in 1946. They had three children: Nicholas Peter (1949), Stephen (1951) and Helen (1956). He died at 33 Cavendish Avenue, Cambridge.
