= Livia S. Eberlin =

Brazilian analytical chemist

Livia Schiavinato Eberlin is a Brazilian analytical chemist who won a MacArthur "Genius" Fellowship for her research on the use of mass spectrometry to detect cancerous tissue.

== Education and career ==
Eberlin is the daughter of Marcos Nogueira Eberlin, a Brazilian chemist at the University of Campinas. She was born in Campinas, and she earned her bachelor's degree in 2007 from the University of Campinas. During her undergraduate studies, she did summer research in mass spectrometry at Purdue University, where her father also had research ties. She later enrolled at Purdue for her doctorate, which she completed in 2012. Her dissertation, Developments in ambient mass spectrometry imaging and its applications in biomedical research and cancer diagnosis, was supervised by R. Graham Cooks.

After postdoctoral research at Stanford University with Richard Zare, she joined the faculty at the University of Texas at Austin in 2015 in the Department of Chemistry. She joined Baylor College of Medicine as Associate Professor in 2021.

== Research ==
Eberlin developed a pen-like device, called the "MasSpec Pen" or "The Cancer Pen", that has demonstrated the capability to detect cancerous tissue by delivering a discrete water droplet to extract biomolecules from the tissue's surface and transporting them to a mass spectrometer for molecular analysis. The pen allows surgeons to achieve a better understanding of which tissues should be removed. As a co-principal investigator at the University of Texas at Austin, Eberlin has developed a method to detect thyroid cancer using Desorption electrospray ionization mass spectrometry (DESI-MS) imaging of fine-needle aspiration biopsies. It is two-thirds more accurate than the test already in use, fine-needle aspiration, which yields more indeterminate results when used in isolation. In addition to her work on cancer diagnosis, Eberlin has also worked with Cooks and her father on the use of mass spectrometry to quickly detect counterfeit money. Eberlin is concerned about the representation of women and diversity in science. In interviews, she has stressed the importance of women in higher levels of academia as well as leadership.

== Awards and recognition ==
Eberlin was named among the Forbes "30 Under 30" list in 2015. She won the Marion Milligan Mason Award of the American Association for the Advancement of Science in 2016. The award is given every two years to promising young female researchers in chemistry. She won the MacArthur "Genius" Fellowship from the John D. and Catherine T. MacArthur Foundation in 2018 for her research on the use of mass spectrometry "to differentiate more quickly and accurately diseased from healthy tissues during surgery". She is the first UT Austin professor to win MacArthur grant this century. The award consists of a $625,000 no-strings-attached grant. According to the foundation, this award goes to "extraordinarily talented and creative individuals as an investment in their potential". She also won the Moore Inventor Fellowship in 2018. She received the 2020 Curt Brunnée Award from the International Mass Spectrometry Foundation. She was named on the Power List by the Analytical Scientist in 2014, 2018, 2019, 2021, 2022, 2023, and 2024. She received the 2024 Norman Hackerman Award from the Welch Foundation and the Biemann Medal from the American Society for Mass Spectrometry in 2025.

== Selected publications ==
=== Research articles ===
- Ifa, Demian R; Eberlin, Livia S (January 1, 2016), "Ambient Ionization Mass Spectrometry for Cancer Diagnosis and Surgical Margin Evaluation", Clinical Chemistry, 62 (1), Oxford University Press (OUP): 111–123, doi:10.1373/clinchem.2014.237172, ISSN 0009-9147, PMC 5315420, PMID 26555455
- Sans, Marta; Gharpure, Kshipra; Tibshirani, Robert; Zhang, Jialing; Liang, Li; Liu, Jinsong; Young, Jonathan H.; Dood, Robert L.; Sood, Anil K.; Eberlin, Livia S. (May 31, 2017), "Metabolic Markers and Statistical Prediction of Serous Ovarian Cancer Aggressiveness by Ambient Ionization Mass Spectrometry Imaging", Cancer Research, 77 (11), American Association for Cancer Research (AACR): 2903–2913, doi:10.1158/0008-5472.can-16-3044, ISSN 0008-5472, PMC 5750373, PMID 28416487
- Santagata, Sandro; Eberlin, Livia S.; Norton, Isaiah; Calligaris, David; Feldman, Daniel R.; Ide, Jennifer L.; Liu, Xiaohui; Wiley, Joshua S.; Vestal, Matthew L.; Ramkissoon, Shakti H.; Orringer, Daniel A.; Gill, Kristen K.; Dunn, Ian F.; Dias-Santagata, Dora; Ligon, Keith L.; Jolesz, Ferenc A.; Golby, Alexandra J.; Cooks, R. Graham; Agar, Nathalie Y. R. (June 30, 2014), "Intraoperative mass spectrometry mapping of an onco-metabolite to guide brain tumor surgery", Proceedings of the National Academy of Sciences, 111 (30): 11121–11126, Bibcode:2014PNAS..11111121S, doi:10.1073/pnas.1404724111, ISSN 0027-8424, PMC 4121790, PMID 24982150
- Correa, Deleon N.; Santos, Jandyson M.; Eberlin, Livia S.; Eberlin, Marcos N.; Teunissen, Sebastiaan F. (February 2, 2016), "Forensic Chemistry and Ambient Mass Spectrometry: A Perfect Couple Destined for a Happy Marriage?", Analytical Chemistry, 88 (5), American Chemical Society (ACS): 2515–2526, doi:10.1021/acs.analchem.5b02397, ISSN 0003-2700, PMID 26768158
- Wu, Chunping; Dill, Allison L.; Eberlin, Livia S.; Cooks, R. Graham; Ifa, Demian R. (September 20, 2012), "Mass spectrometry imaging under ambient conditions", Mass Spectrometry Reviews, 32 (3), Wiley: 218–243, doi:10.1002/mas.21360, ISSN 0277-7037, PMC 3530640, PMID 22996621
- Eberlin, Livia S.; Norton, Isaiah; Orringer, Daniel; Dunn, Ian F.; Liu, Xiaohui; Ide, Jennifer L.; Jarmusch, Alan K.; Ligon, Keith L.; Jolesz, Ferenc A.; Golby, Alexandra J.; Santagata, Sandro; Agar, Nathalie Y. R.; Cooks, R. Graham (January 8, 2013), "Ambient mass spectrometry for the intraoperative molecular diagnosis of human brain tumors", Proceedings of the National Academy of Sciences, 110 (5): 1611–1616, Bibcode:2013PNAS..110.1611E, doi:10.1073/pnas.1215687110, ISSN 0027-8424, PMC 3562800, PMID 23300285
- Eberlin, Livia S.; Norton, Isaiah; Dill, Allison L.; Golby, Alexandra J.; Ligon, Keith L.; Santagata, Sandro; Cooks, R. Graham; Agar, Nathalie Y.R. (January 31, 2012), "Classifying Human Brain Tumors by Lipid Imaging with Mass Spectrometry", Cancer Research, 72 (3), American Association for Cancer Research (AACR): 645–654, doi:10.1158/0008-5472.can-11-2465, ISSN 0008-5472, PMC 3271168, PMID 22139378
