= Evgenii Przhevalsky =

Soviet chemist

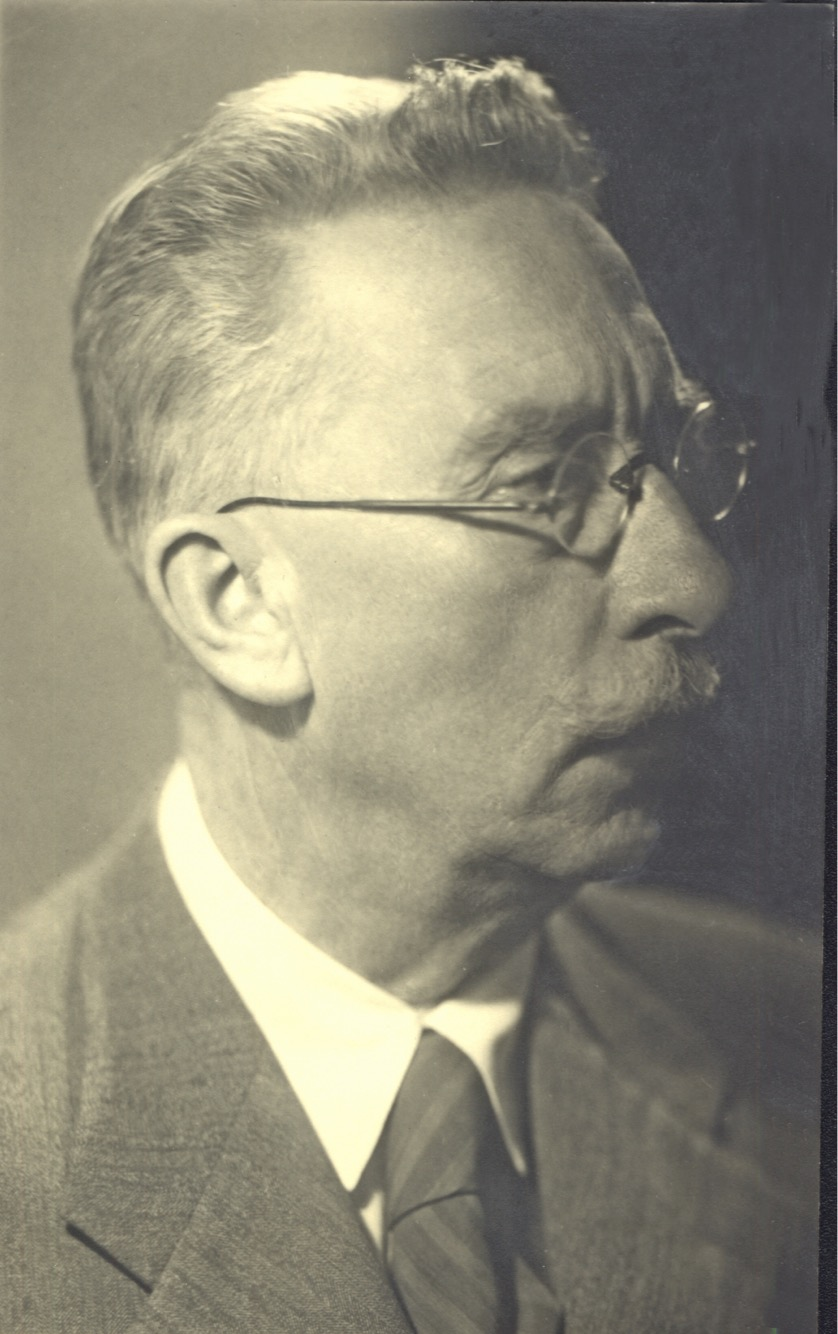
- Born: 12 January [O.S. 31 December 1878] 1879; Pereiaslavl, Poltava Governorate, Russian Empire
- Died: 12 June 1953 (aged 74); Moscow, Soviet Union
- Citizenship: Russian Empire, Soviet Union
- Education: Moscow University
- Awards: Order of Lenin, Order of the Badge of Honour
- Scientific career
- Fields: Analytical Chemistry
- Workplaces: Moscow State University

Evgenii Stepanovich Przhevalsky (Russian: Евгений Степанович Пржевальский, 12 January 1879 (O.S. 31 December 1878) – 12 June 1953) – Russian and Soviet chemist, Doctor of Chemical Science, professor of Moscow University, dean of Faculty of Chemistry (1939–1944).

== Biography ==
He was born on January 12, 1879, in the town of Pereiaslav, Poltava Governorate. After graduating from Nizhyn classical gymnasium in 1898, he entered the natural department of the Faculty of Physics and Mathematics at Moscow University. While still a student, Przhevalsky began research in organic chemistry under the guidance of V.V. Markovnikov, and then worked with academician N.D. Zelinsky. At the beginning of his scientific activity (until 1917) he was engaged in the synthesis of unsaturated hydrocarbons and the study of the oxidation of fatty and fatty-aromatic acids. Results were printed in seven articles in "Journal of the Russian Physico-Chemical Society".

After the October Revolution, together with A.V. Rakovsky, V.V. Longinov, I.V. Kulikov and A.E. Uspensky, Evgenii Stepanovich participated in the establishment of the Institute of Chemical Reagents. A special place in the work of the Institute was occupied by the Department of Analytical Chemistry, which had the task of developing methods for controlling the production of reagents and their quality. Under the leadership of E.S. Przhevalsky, work was carried out on the compilation of more than 200 standards for chemical reagents, which were approved and published as All-Union standards.

He was Dean of the Faculty of Chemistry at Moscow State University (1939-1944), Head of the Department of Analytical Chemistry (1933-1953), and Director of the Research Institute of Chemistry at Moscow State University (1939-1953).

In 1930, Evgenii Stepanovich was asked to head the Department of Analytical Chemistry, which had been organized at the Faculty of Chemistry of Moscow State University in 1929. At the Department of Analytical Chemistry, Przhevalsky continued and developed work on the determination of small amounts of substances, beginning with the development of standard methods for testing reactive salts.

In 1933, together with V.M. Peshkova, he developed a method for the determination of chlorine in potassium iodide. Przhevalsky was involved in the development of methods for the analysis of palladium (he studied the formation of complexes of Pd(II) with organic reagents, synthesized the reagent n-rhodananiline), uranium (developed a method for the determination of uranium in the form of uranium iodate IV), thorium (colorimetric determination of thorium using azo compounds) and other rare elements. With his participation, he developed methods for the determination of cerium in the presence of thorium, rare earth elements and titanium; colorimetric and fluorescent methods for the determination of beryllium.

During the years of the Great Patriotic War in evacuation in Ashgabat at the Department of Analytical Chemistry under the direction of the Head of the Department, Professor Przhevalsky and Professor K.L. Malyarov conducted chemical analysis of antifreezes, on behalf of defense organizations studied a variety of materials coming from the front. During the war years the Department carried out chemical analysis of several thousand samples of Soviet and trophy materials. At the request of the Geological Department and other organizations the Department carried out a multilateral chemical analysis of local polymetallic ores, salts and other materials.

In addition to scientific and pedagogical activities, Przhevalsky was also engaged in literary work; a number of books and textbooks were published under his editorship. In addition, for several years he was a member of the editorial board of the journal "Zavodskaya Laboratoria".

He died on June 12, 1953, and was buried in Moscow.

== Literature ==
- Journal of Analytical Chemistry. 4 (1): 3. 1949.
- Zavodskaya Laboratoriya. 15 (1): 127. 1949
- Bulletin of Moscow University. Series of physical, mathematical and natural sciences. 1: 3-4. 1949.
- Faculty of Chemistry of Moscow State University. The path of three quarters of a century. Moscow: TERRA Calender. 2005. p. 304.
- History and Methodology of Natural Sciences. Issue 18. Chemistry. Moscow: Moscow State University. 1976. pp. 55–76.
- Ryabukhin, A.G.; Bryantseva, G.V. (2005). Professors of Moscow University 1755-2004: A Biographical Dictionary. Moscow: Moscow State University. pp. 121–122.
- Moscow University in the Great Patriotic War (4th ed.). Moscow: Moscow State University. 2020. pp. 110–112. ISBN 978-5-19-011499-7.
