= Johann Konrad Eberlein =

Austrian art historian

Johann Konrad Eberlein (born 1948) is an Austrian art historian.

From 1998 to 2012, he was a professor of art history at the University of Graz, Graz, Austria.

== Works ==
- Apparitio regis – revelatio veritatis. Studien zur Darstellung des Vorhangs in der bildenden Kunst von der Spätantike bis zum Ende des Mittelalters, Reichert, Wiesbaden 1982, ISBN 3-88226-113-7 (Dissertation).
- Miniatur und Arbeit: Das Medium Buchmalerei, 1995, ISBN 3518582011
- Grundlagen der Mittelalterlichen Kunst. Eine Quellenkunde, 1996, ISBN 349601153X
- Albrecht Dürer, 2003
- Harald de Bary: Leben und Werk, 2006, ISBN 978-3-86638-123-0.
- "Angelus Novus": Paul Klees Bild und Walter Benjamins Deutung, 2006, ISBN 3793092801
- with Paul von Naredi-Rainer, Götz Pochat (eds.): Hauptwerke der Kunstgeschichtsschreibung. Kröner, Stuttgart 2010, ISBN 3534236580
