= Atomic emission spectroscopy =

Analytical method using radiation to identify chemical elements in a sample

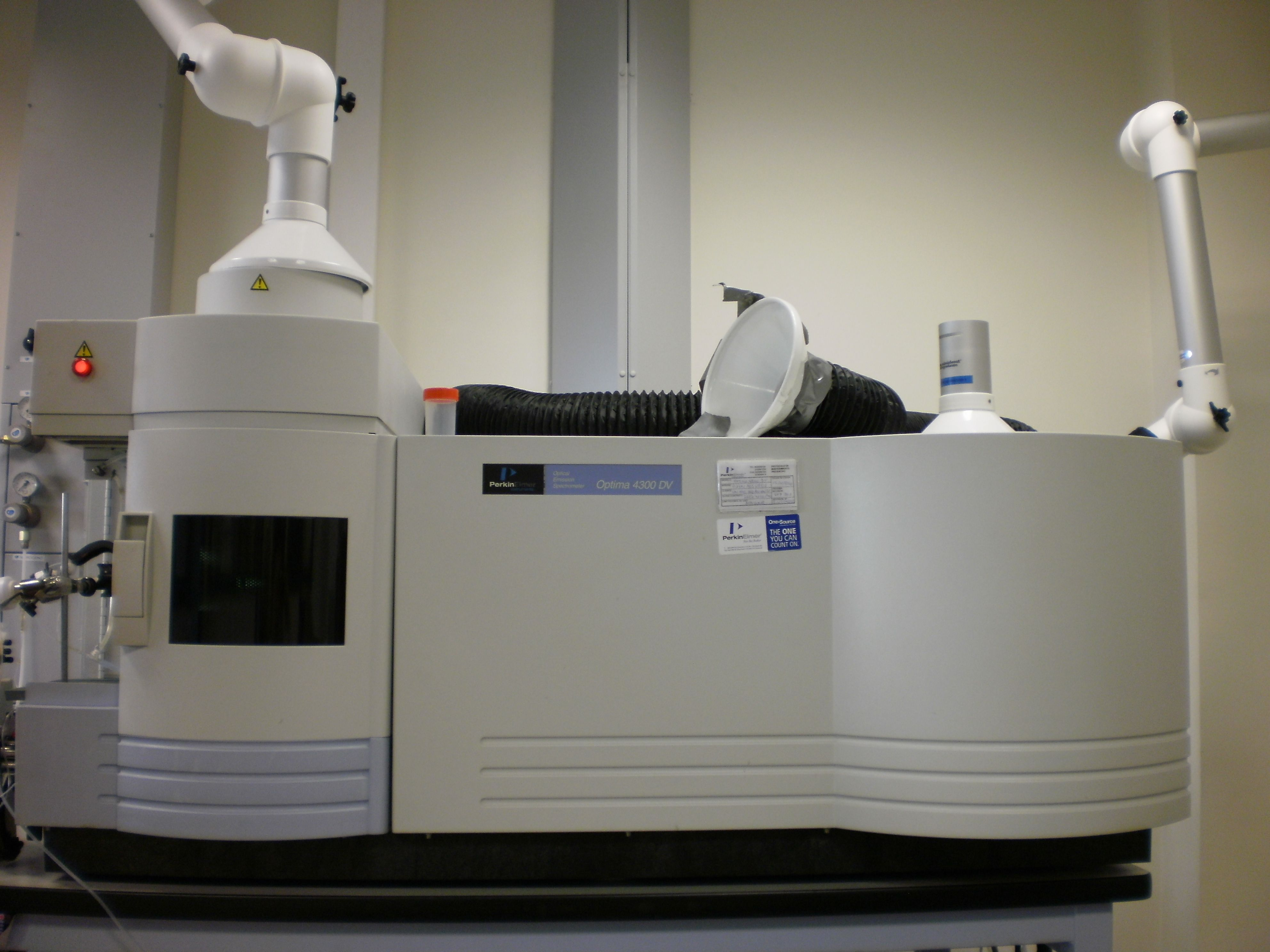
Inductively coupled plasma atomic emission spectrometer

Atomic emission spectroscopy (AES) is a method of chemical analysis that uses the intensity of light emitted from a flame, plasma, arc, or spark at a particular wavelength to determine the quantity of an element in a sample. The wavelength of the atomic spectral line in the emission spectrum gives the identity of the element while the intensity of the emitted light is proportional to the number of atoms of the element. The sample may be excited by various methods.

Atomic Emission Spectroscopy allows us to measure interactions between electromagnetic radiation and physical atoms and molecules. This interaction is measured in the form of electromagnetic waves representing the changes in energy between atomic energy levels. When elements are burned by a flame, they emit electromagnetic radiation that can be recorded in the form of spectral lines. Each element has its own unique spectral line because each element has a different atomic arrangement, so this method is an important tool for identifying the makeup of materials. Robert Bunsen and Gustav Kirchhoff were the first to establish atomic emission spectroscopy as a tool in chemistry.

When an element is burned in a flame, its atoms move from the ground electronic state to the excited electronic state. As atoms in the excited state move back down into the ground state, they emit light. The Boltzmann expression is used to relate temperature to the number of atoms in the excited state where larger temperatures indicate a larger population of excited atoms. This relationship is written as:

$\frac{n_{upper}}{n_{lower}}=\frac{g_{upper}}{g_{lower}}e^{-(\varepsilon_{upper}-\varepsilon_{lower})}/k_{B}T$

where n_{upper} and n_{lower} are the number of atoms in the higher and lower energy levels, g_{upper} and g_{lower} are the degeneracies in the higher and lower energy levels, and ε_{upper} and ε_{lower} are the energies of the higher and lower energy levels. The wavelengths of this light can be dispersed and measured by a monochromator, and the intensity of the light can be leveraged to determine the number of excited state electrons present. For atomic emission spectroscopy, the radiation emitted by atoms in the excited state are measured specifically after they have already been excited.

Much information can be obtained from the use of atomic emission spectroscopy by interpreting the spectral lines produced from exciting an atom. The width of spectral lines can provide information about an atom’s kinetic temperature and electron density. Looking at the different intensities of spectral lines is useful for determining the chemical makeup of mixtures and materials. Atomic emission spectroscopy is mainly used for determining the makeup of mixes of molecules because each element has its own unique spectrum.

== Flame ==
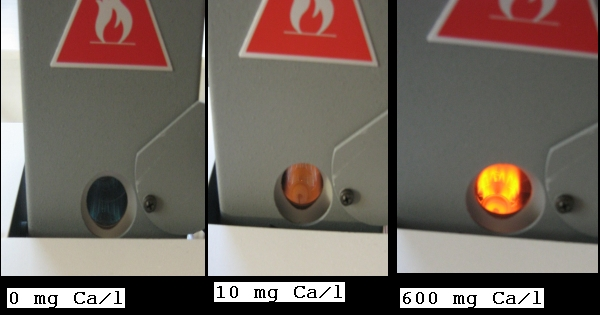
A flame during the assessment of calcium ions in a flame photometer

The sample of a material (analyte) is brought into the flame as a gas, sprayed solution, or directly inserted into the flame by use of a small loop of wire, usually platinum. The heat from the flame evaporates the solvent and breaks intramolecular bonds to create free atoms. The thermal energy also excites the atoms into excited electronic states that subsequently emit light when they return to the ground electronic state. Each element emits light at a characteristic wavelength, which is dispersed by a grating or prism and detected in the spectrometer.

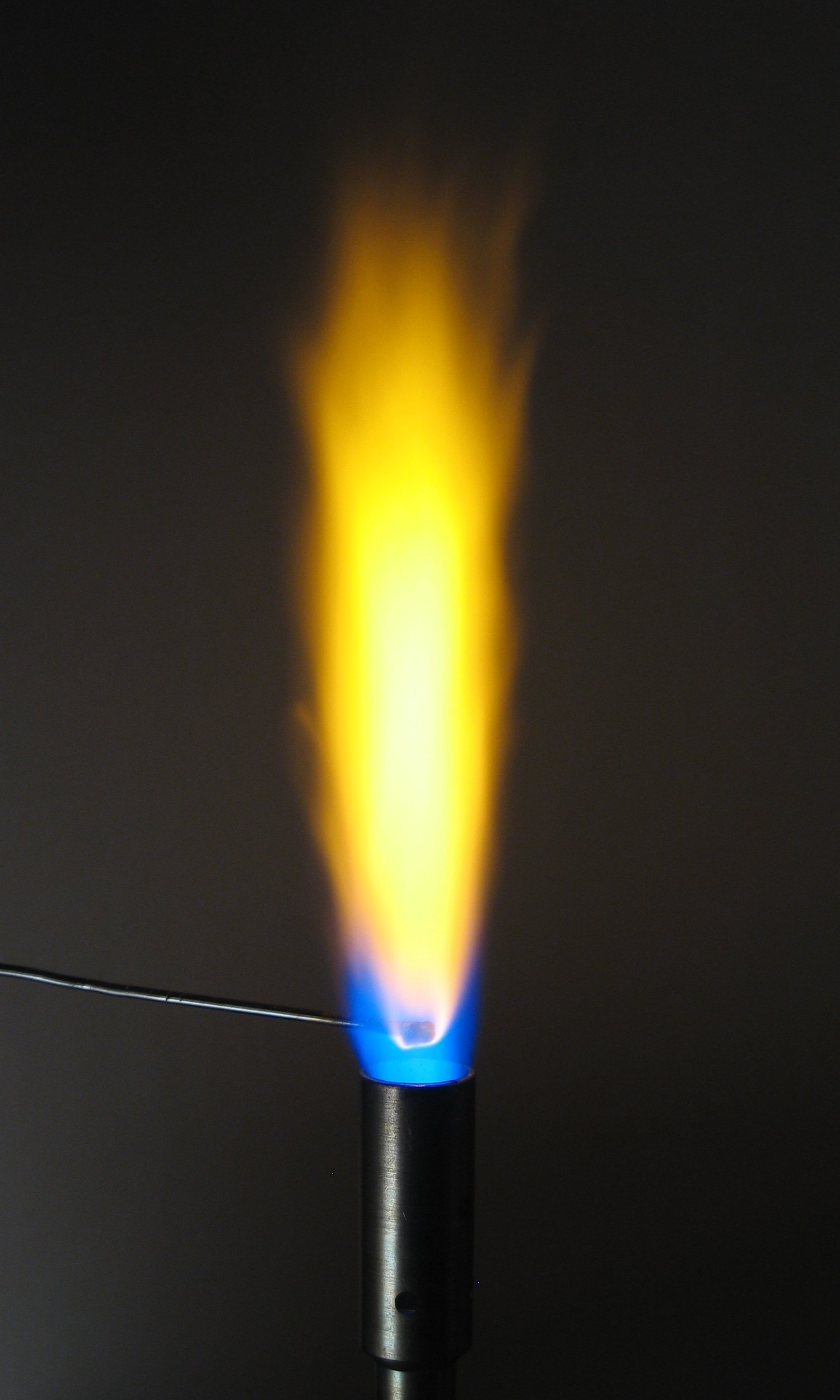
Sodium atomic ions emitting light in a flame displays a brilliantly bright yellow emission at 588.9950 and 589.5924 nanometers wavelength.

A frequent application of the emission measurement with the flame is the regulation of alkali metals for pharmaceutical analytics.

== Inductively coupled plasma ==
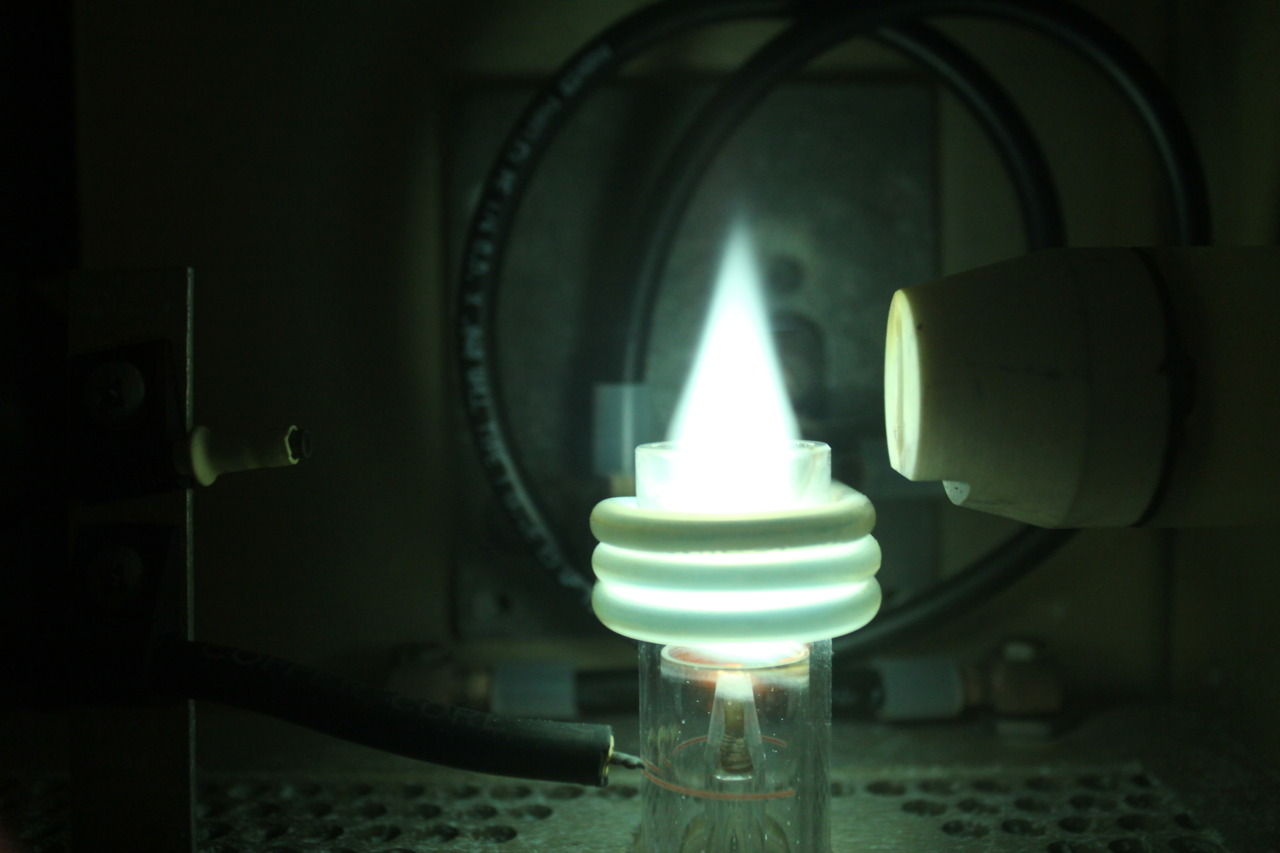
Inductively coupled plasma atomic emission source

Inductively coupled plasma atomic emission spectroscopy (ICP-AES) uses an inductively coupled plasma to produce excited atoms and ions that emit electromagnetic radiation at wavelengths characteristic of a particular element.

Advantages of ICP-AES are the excellent limit of detection and linear dynamic range, multi-element capability, low chemical interference and a stable and reproducible signal. Disadvantages are spectral interferences (many emission lines), cost and operating expense and the fact that samples typically must be in a liquid solution. Inductively coupled plasma (ICP) source of the emission consists of an induction coil and plasma. An induction coil is a coil of wire that has an alternating current flowing through it. This current induces a magnetic field inside the coil, coupling a great deal of energy to plasma contained in a quartz tube inside the coil. Plasma is a collection of charged particles (cations and electrons) capable, by virtue of their charge, of interacting with a magnetic field. The plasmas used in atomic emissions are formed by ionizing a flowing stream of argon gas. Plasma's high-temperature results from resistive heating as the charged particles move through the gas. Because plasmas operate at much higher temperatures than flames, they provide better atomization and a higher population of excited states. The predominant form of sample matrix in ICP-AES today is a liquid sample: acidified water or solids digested into aqueous forms. Liquid samples are pumped into the nebulizer and sample chamber via a peristaltic pump. Then the samples pass through a nebulizer that creates a fine mist of liquid particles. Larger water droplets condense on the sides of the spray chamber and are removed via the drain, while finer water droplets move with the argon flow and enter the plasma. With plasma emission, it is possible to analyze solid samples directly. These procedures include incorporating electrothermal vaporization, laser and spark ablation, and glow-discharge vaporization.

== Spark and arc ==
Spark or arc atomic emission spectroscopy is used for the analysis of metallic elements in solid samples. For non-conductive materials, the sample is ground with graphite powder to make it conductive. In traditional arc spectroscopy methods, a sample of the solid was commonly ground up and destroyed during analysis. An electric arc or spark is passed through the sample, heating it to a high temperature to excite the atoms within it. The excited analyte atoms emit light at characteristic wavelengths that can be dispersed with a monochromator and detected. In the past, the spark or arc conditions were typically not well controlled, the analysis for the elements in the sample were qualitative. However, modern spark sources with controlled discharges can be considered quantitative. Both qualitative and quantitative spark analysis are widely used for production quality control in foundry and metal casting facilities.

== See also ==
- Atomic absorption spectroscopy
- Atomic spectroscopy
- Glow-discharge optical emission spectroscopy
- Inductively coupled plasma atomic emission spectroscopy
- Laser-induced breakdown spectroscopy

== Bibliography ==
- Reynolds, R. J.; Thompson, K. C. (1978). Atomic absorption, fluorescence, and flame emission spectroscopy: a practical approach. New York: Wiley. ISBN 0-470-26478-0.
- Uden, Peter C. (1992). Element-specific chromatographic detection by atomic emission spectroscopy. Columbus, OH: American Chemical Society. ISBN 0-8412-2174-X.
