= Red 2 =

Red 2 may refer to:

- Amaranth (dye) (also FD&C Red No. 2), a modified red azo dye used as a food dye and to color cosmetics
- Citrus Red 2, an artificial dye
- Red 2 (film), an American action comedy film and sequel to the 2010 film Red
- "Red 2", a 1994 single by English electronic music DJ, producer and radio presenter Dave Clarke
- "Red-2", a season-four episode of the police procedural drama television series NCIS: Los Angeles
- Wedge Antilles (also called Red Two), a fictional character in the Star Wars franchise
