= Citrus Red 2 =

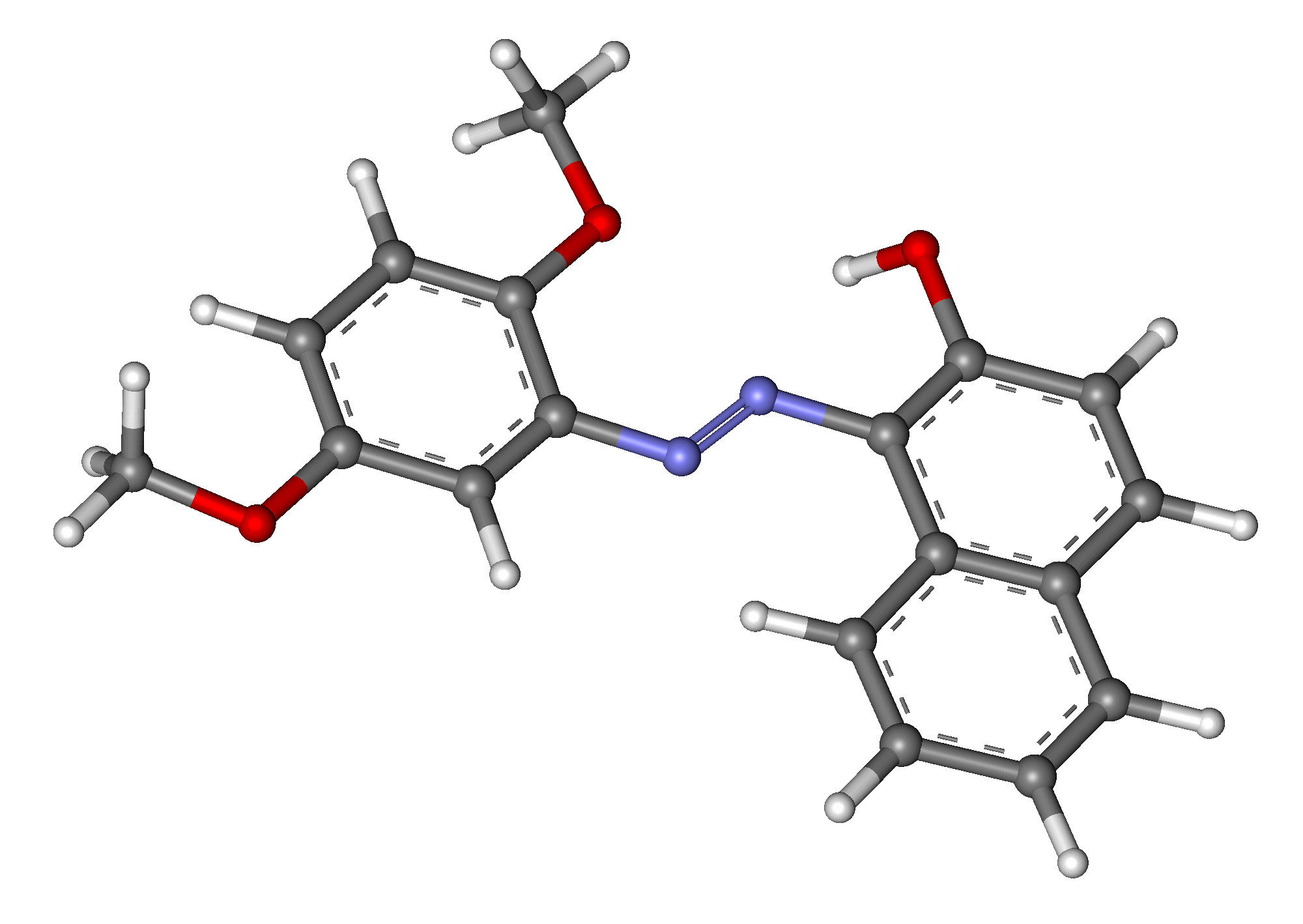

Names
- IUPAC name 1-(2,5-Dimethoxy-phenylazo)-naphthalen-2-ol
- Other names: Citrus Red No. 2; C.I. Solvent Red 80; C.I. 12156; E121

Identifiers
CAS Number	6358-53-8
3D model (JSmol)	Interactive image
ChemSpider	16735746
ECHA InfoCard	100.026.162
E number	E121 (colours)
KEGG	C19214
PubChem CID	9570225
UNII	2QE5Y68984
CompTox Dashboard (EPA)	DTXSID6024838
- InChI: InChI=1S/C18H16N2O3/c1-22-13-8-10-17(23-2)15(11-13)19-20-18-14-6-4-3-5-12(14)7-9-16(18)21/h3-11,21H,1-2H3/b20-19+ Key: GJUABKCEXOMRPQ-FMQUCBEESA-N; InChI=1/C18H16N2O3/c1-22-13-8-10-17(23-2)15(11-13)19-20-18-14-6-4-3-5-12(14)7-9-16(18)21/h3-11,21H,1-2H3/b20-19+ Key: GJUABKCEXOMRPQ-FMQUCBEEBN
- SMILES: COc3ccc(cc3/N=N/c1c2ccccc2ccc1O)OC

Properties
Chemical formula	C_{18}H_{16}N_{2}O_{3}
Molar mass	308.337 g·mol^{−1}
Appearance	Orange to yellow solid or a dark red powder
Melting point	156 °C (313 °F; 429 K)
Solubility in water	Insoluble

Hazards
NFPA 704 (fire diamond)	0 0 0
- Except where otherwise noted, data are given for materials in their standard state (at 25 °C [77 °F], 100 kPa). verify (what is ?) Infobox references

Citrus Red 2, Citrus Red No. 2, C.I. Solvent Red 80, or C.I. 12156 is an artificial dye. As a food dye, it has been permitted by the US Food and Drug Administration (FDA) since 1956 to color the skin of oranges. It is not approved in Europe, and is assigned E Number 121. Citrus Red 2 is listed by the International Agency for Research on Cancer (IARC) as a group 2B carcinogen, a substance "possibly carcinogenic to humans".

== Properties ==
Citrus Red 2 is an orange to yellow solid or a dark red powder with a melting point of 156 °C. It is not soluble in water, but is readily soluble in many organic solvents.

== Use ==
In the United States, Citrus Red 2 has sometimes been used to color orange peels, subject to a limit of 2 milligrams per kilogram of oranges. It is permitted when the fruit is intended to be eaten, but not when the fruit is intended for processing; for example, to manufacture orange juice.

On April 22, 2025, the FDA announced plans to phase out synthetic food dyes by the end of 2026. This decision, led by FDA Commissioner Martin Makary, was driven by growing concerns over the potential health risks associated with synthetic food dyes. As part of this phase-out, the FDA revealed its intention to revoke approval for Citrus Red 2, along with another restricted-use dye, Orange B.
