= Orange B =

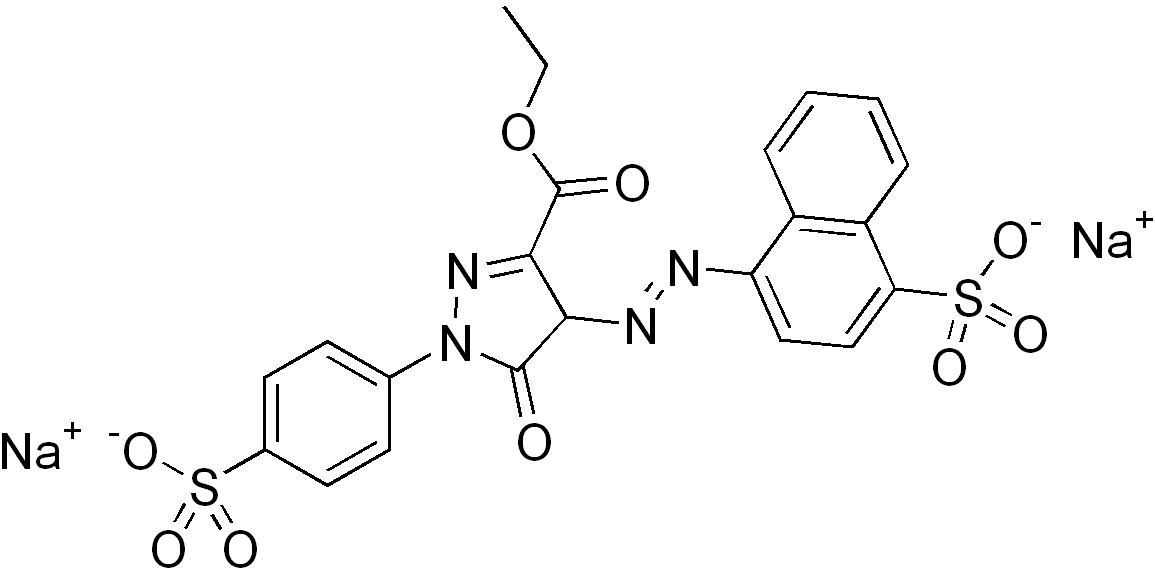

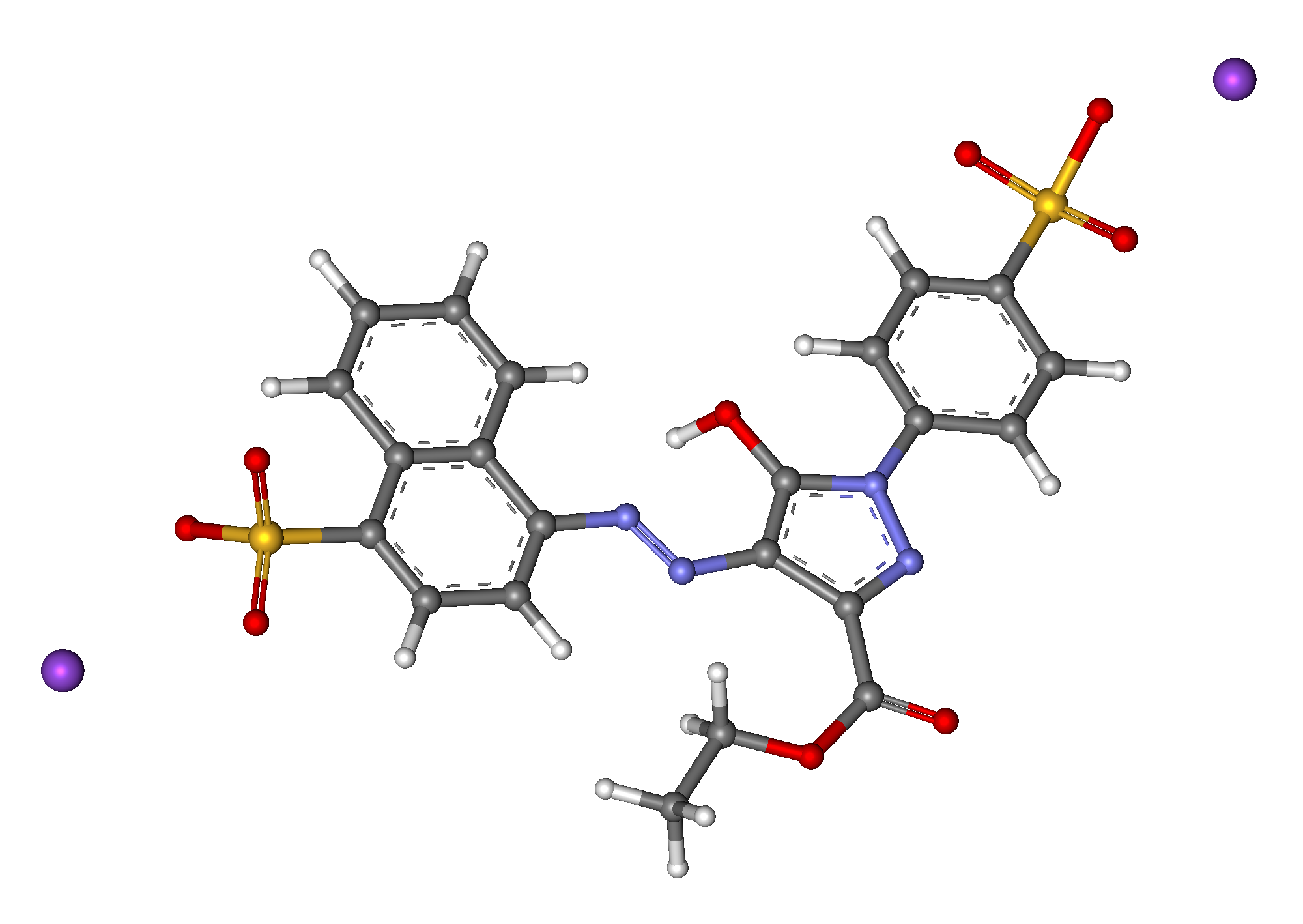

Names
- IUPAC name Disodium 4-[N'-[3-ethoxycarbonyl-5-oxo-1-(4-sulfonatophenyl)-4-pyrazolylidene]hydrazino]-1-naphthalenesulfonate
- Other names C.I. Acid Orange 137; CI 19235

Identifiers
CAS Number	15139-76-1
3D model (JSmol)	Interactive image
ChemSpider	16735944
ECHA InfoCard	100.035.622
EC Number	239-201-5
PubChem CID	5362511
UNII	RGU455OS50
CompTox Dashboard (EPA)	DTXSID7044219
- InChI: InChI=1S/C22H18N4O9S2.2Na/c1-2-35-22(28)20-19(21(27)26(25-20)13-7-9-14(10-8-13)36(29,30)31)24-23-17-11-12-18(37(32,33)34)16-6-4-3-5-15(16)17;;/h3-12,27H,2H2,1H3,(H,29,30,31)(H,32,33,34);;/q;2*+1/p-2/b24-23+;; Key: LLTKITSFUJSOCC-KPOOZVEVSA-L; InChI=1/C22H18N4O9S2.2Na/c1-2-35-22(28)20-19(21(27)26(25-20)13-7-9-14(10-8-13)36(29,30)31)24-23-17-11-12-18(37(32,33)34)16-6-4-3-5-15(16)17;;/h3-12,27H,2H2,1H3,(H,29,30,31)(H,32,33,34);;/q;2*+1/p-2/b24-23+;; Key: LLTKITSFUJSOCC-AQVGDJFIBI
- SMILES: [Na+].[Na+].[O-]S(=O)(=O)c4ccc(/N=N/c2c(nn(c1ccc(cc1)S([O-])(=O)=O)c2O)C(=O)OCC)c3ccccc34

Properties
Chemical formula	C_{22}H_{16}N_{4}Na_{2}O_{9}S_{2}
Molar mass	590.49 g/mol
- Except where otherwise noted, data are given for materials in their standard state (at 25 °C [77 °F], 100 kPa). verify (what is ?) Infobox references

Orange B is a food dye from the azo dye group. It is approved by the United States Food and Drug Administration (FDA) for use only in hot dog and sausage casings or surfaces, up to 150 parts per million of the finished food weight. It is typically prepared as a disodium salt.

Orange B was first approved by the FDA for use as a certified food dye on January 4, 1966. However, in 1978, the FDA proposed removing it from the list of approved food additives due to concerns over potential carcinogenic contaminants, particularly the presence of 2-naphthylamine. Around the same time, its sole U.S. manufacturer, the William J. Stange Company, ceased production.

On September 17, 2025, the FDA proposed revoking the regulation that authorizes Orange B, after determining that the dye's use has been abandoned by industry and that the regulation is no longer necessary. According to FDA records, no batches of Orange B have been certified or requested since 1978. This proposal is part of a broader initiative, started April 22, 2025, to phase out synthetic dyes in the U.S. food supply.
